= 2010 Bossier–Shreveport Battle Wings season =

Arena Football League team season

2010 Bossier-Shreveport Battle Wings season
- Head coach: Jon Norris
- Home stadium: CenturyTel Center

Results
- Record: 3–13
- Division place: 4th AC Southwest
- Playoffs: did not qualify

The 2010 Bossier–Shreveport Battle Wings season was the 9th season for the franchise, and the first in the Arena Football League, coming from the AF2, which dissolved following the 2009 season. The team was coached by Jon Norris and played their home games at CenturyTel Center. With a 3–13 record, the Battle Wings failed to qualify for the playoffs, finishing last in the American Conference.

== Standings ==
Southwest Division
Team	W	L	PCT	PF	PA	DIV	CON	Home	Away
y-Tulsa Talons	10	6	.625	994	899	6–0	9–2	6–2	4–4
Oklahoma City Yard Dawgz	6	10	.375	833	870	3–3	4–6	5–3	1–7
Dallas Vigilantes	3	13	.187	800	920	2–4	2–9	1–7	2–6
Bossier–Shreveport Battle Wings	3	13	.187	799	1030	1–5	3–9	2–6	1–7

y - Clinched division

== Regular season schedule ==
The Battle Wings opened the season at home against the Vipers on April 3. The conclusion of the regular season was at home against the Vigilantes on July 31.

Week	Day	Date	Kickoff	Opponent	Results		Location	Report
Week	Day	Date	Kickoff	Opponent	Score	Record	Location	Report
1	Saturday	April 3	8:05 pm	Alabama Vipers	W 54–48	1–0	CenturyTel Center	^{[usurped]}
2	Friday	April 9	8:05 pm	Orlando Predators	W 73–67	2–0	CenturyTel Center	^{[usurped]}
3	Saturday	April 17	10:00 pm	at Spokane Shock	L 70–78	2–1	Spokane Veterans Memorial Arena	
4	Bye							
5	Friday	April 30	9:05 pm	at Utah Blaze	L 46–65	2–2	E Center	
6	Saturday	May 8	8:05 pm	at Oklahoma City Yard Dawgz	L 79–88	2–3	Cox Convention Center	^{[usurped]}
7	Saturday	May 15	8:05 pm	Tampa Bay Storm	L 44–48	2–4	CenturyTel Center	
8	Saturday	May 22	8:30 pm	at Alabama Vipers	L 19–56	2–5	Von Braun Center	^{[usurped]}
9	Saturday	May 29	8:05 pm	Tulsa Talons	L 48–52	2–6	CenturyTel Center	
10	Friday	June 4	8:30 pm	at Dallas Vigilantes	W 70–69	3–6	American Airlines Center	
11	Saturday	June 12	8:05 pm	Iowa Barnstormers	L 42–48	3–7	CenturyTel Center	
12	Saturday	June 19	10:30 pm	at Arizona Rattlers	L 50–79	3–8	US Airways Center	^{[usurped]}
13	Friday	June 25	8:00 pm	at Tampa Bay Storm	L 39–78	3–9	St. Pete Times Forum	^{[usurped]}
14	Saturday	July 3	8:05 pm	Oklahoma City Yard Dawgz	L 44–70	3–10	CenturyTel Center	
15	Saturday	July 10	8:00 pm	at Tulsa Talons	L 45–74	3–11	BOK Center	
16	Bye							
17	Saturday	July 24	8:05 pm	Jacksonville Sharks	L 20–48	3–12	CenturyTel Center	
18	Saturday	July 31	8:05 pm	Dallas Vigilantes	L 56–62	3–13	CenturyTel Center	

All times are EDT

== Roster ==
Bossier-Shreveport Battle Wings roster
Quarterbacks: 10 Gary Cooper; 7 Kinsmon Lancaster; 6 James Welker III; Fullbacks: 32 Jason Schule; Wide receivers: 8 P.J. Berry; 12 Randy Hymes; 5 James Jordan; 15 Christian Wise	Offensive linemen: 54 Kimani Jones C; 98 Moqut Ruffins G/TE; 99 Kenyon Scott G/TE; Defensive linemen: 33 Henry Bryant LB/FB; 94 Marvin Byrdsong FB; 92 McKinner Dixon; 75 Xavier Kennedy; 91 Elex Reed	Linebackers: 3 Willis Marshall KR/WR; 16 Gus Tyson FB; Defensive backs: 1 Roland Cola; 22 Phillip Geiggar; 24 Chad Johnson; 31 Akili Schuba-Baruti; 28 Jerron Wishom; Kickers: 2 Nick Gatto	Injured reserve: 9 Ahmad Brown DB; -- Johnnie Butler WR/LB PUP; 78 Aaron Gibson G; 4 Raymond Philyaw QB; 20 Nick Ward DB; Exempt list: Currently vacant; Suspended list: 84 Manwell Talbert WR/LB; Rookies in italics; Roster updated June 30, 2010; 24 Active, 6 Inactive

== Regular season ==
=== Week 1: vs. Alabama Vipers ===
Quarter	1	2	3	4	Total
Vipers	7	13	7	21	48
Battle Wings	13	20	0	21	54

at CenturyTel Center, Bossier City, Louisiana

- Date: April 3
- Game time: 8:05 pm EDT
- Game attendance: 2,974
- Referee: Scott Vaughn
- Recap

Game information

1st quarter

- Bossier–Shreveport – Willis Marshall 23-yard pass from Raymond Philyaw (Art Carmody kick no good), 13:38
- Alabama – Dan Alexander 3-yard run (Brian Jackson kick), 7:13
- Bossier–Shreveport – PJ Berry 2-yard run (Art Carmody kick), 1:40

2nd quarter

- Alabama – Dan Alexander 3-yard run (Brian Jackson kick), 12:18
- Bossier–Shreveport – PJ Berry 2-yard pass from Raymond Philyaw (Art Carmody kick), 10:01
- Alabama – Jeremy Grier 7-yard pass from Kevin Eakin (Brian Jackson kick no good), 6:07
- Bossier–Shreveport – James Jordan 3 yd pass from Raymond Philyaw (Art Carmody kick no good), 2:57
- Bossier–Shreveport – PJ Berry 2-yard pass from Raymond Philyaw (Art Carmody kick), 0:06

3rd quarter

- Alabama – Dan Alexander 2-yard run (Brian Jackson kick), 7:34

4th quarter

- Alabama – Dan Alexander 4-yard run (Brian Jackson kick), 14:25
- Bossier–Shreveport – PJ Berry 4-yard pass from Raymond Philyaw (Kinsmon Lancaster pass), 9:16
- Bossier–Shreveport – Manwell Talbert 29-yard pass from Raymond Philyaw (Art Carmody kick), 4:37
- Alabama – CJ Johnson 5-yard pass from Kevin Eakin (Brian Jackson kick), 5:10
- Alabama – Dan Alexander 1-yard run (Brian Jackson kick), 1:56
- Bossier–Shreveport – Willis Marshall 11-yard pass from Raymond Philyaw (Art Carmody kick no good), 0:05

Passing

- Alabama – Kevin Eakin: 22/38, 288 yards, 2 TD
- Bossier–Shreveport – Raymond Philyaw: 28/42, 306 yards, 7 TD

Rushing

- Alabama – Dan Alexander: 10 att, 17 yards, 5 TD
- Bossier–Shreveport – Byron Douzart: 2 att, 7 yards

Receiving

- Alabama – Michael Johnson: 14 rec, 229 yards
- Bossier–Shreveport – James Jordan: 11 rec, 99 yards, 1 TD

The Battle wings were in command at halftime with a 33–20 lead, but the Vipers were able to tie the game in the 4th quarter. With the game still tied in the 4th quarter at 48–48, the Battle Wings scored the go-ahead touchdown with five seconds left on an 11-yard pass. The game had a strange ending, as Alabama wide receiver Michael Johnson caught a pass and ran up the field as time expired. Johnson was tackled into the wall that borders the sideline at the 5-yard line and then gave the ball to teammate Jason Geathers who crossed the goal line. The officials signaled the play a touchdown, which meant the Vipers only needed a successful extra point to win the game. After several minutes of discussion between the officials, the original call was overturned as the rules state that a player who is pinned against the wall is out of bounds. Because there was no time left on the clock, the Vipers could not run another play, and the Battle Wings had won the game.

Former Cleveland Gladiators quarterback Raymond Philyaw threw for over 300 yards in his first game with the Battle Wings.

=== Week 2: vs. Orlando Predators ===
Quarter	1	2	3	4	Total
Predators	7	26	13	21	67
Battle Wings	20	28	6	19	73

at CenturyTel Center, Bossier City, Louisiana

- Date: April 10
- Game time: 8:05 pm EDT
- Game attendance: 3,513
- Referee: Scott Vaughn
- Recap

Game information

1st quarter

- Bossier–Shreveport – P.J. Berry 17-yard pass from Raymond Philyaw (Art Carmody kick), 12:12
- Bossier–Shreveport – Randy Hymes 33-yard pass from Raymond Philyaw (Art Carmody kick no good), 8:16
- Orlando – Marlon Moye-Moore 1-yard run (Carlos Martinez kick), 4:09
- Bossier–Shreveport – P.J. Berry 24-yard pass from Raymond Philyaw (Art Carmody kick), 2:13

2nd quarter

- Orlando – Nick Hill 1-yard run (Carlos Martinez kick), 13:01
- Bossier–Shreveport – P.J. Berry 7-yard pass from Raymond Philyaw (Art Carmody kick), 10:32
- Orlando – Nick Hill 5-yard run (Carlos Martinez kick no good), 7:03
- Bossier–Shreveport – P.J. Berry 31-yard pass from Raymond Philyaw (Art Carmody kick), 6:19
- Orlando – James Lynch 1-yard run (Carlos Martinez kick), 3:51
- Bossier–Shreveport – Willis Marshall 18-yard pass from Raymond Philyaw (Art Carmody kick), 0:52
- Orlando – James Lynch 16-yard run (Carlos Martinez kick no good), 0:24
- Bossier–Shreveport – P.J. Berry 55-yard field goal return (Art Carmody kick), 0:00

3rd quarter

- Orlando – Derrick Lewis 11-yard pass from Nick Hill (Carlos Martinez kick), 12:15
- Bossier–Shreveport – Henry Bryant 1-yard pass from Raymond Philyaw (Art Carmody kick no good), 8:01
- Orlando – Nick Hill 1-yard run (Carlos Martinez kick no good), 2:24

4th quarter

- Bossier–Shreveport – P.J. Berry 20-yard pass from Raymond Philyaw (Art Carmody kick), 14:23
- Orlando – Robert Quiroga 7-yard pass from Nick Hill (Carlos Martinez kick), 10:01
- Bossier–Shreveport – Byron Douzart 2-yard run (Art Carmody kick no good), 8:41
- Orlando – T.T. Toliver 13-yard pass from Nick Hill (Carlos Martinez kick), 7:00
- Bossier–Shreveport – P.J. Berry 36-yard pass from Raymond Philyaw (Art Carmody kick no good), 2:08
- Orlando – T.T. Toliver 1-yard pass from Nick Hill (Carlos Martinez kick), 0:07

Passing

- Orlando – Nick Hill: 36/46, 381 yards, 4 TD
- Bossier–Shreveport – Raymond Philyaw: 26/33, 324 yards, 9 TD

Rushing

- Orlando – Nick Hill: 5 att, 17 yards, 3 TD
- Bossier–Shreveport – Byron Douzart: 8 att, 25 yards, 1 TD

Receiving

- Orlando – T.T. Toliver: 16 rec, 195 yards, 2 TD
- Bossier–Shreveport – P.J. Berry: 14 rec, 201 yards, 6 TD

The Battle Wings improved to 2–0 after being able to hold off the Orlando Predators. The key play of the game was a missed field goal by Orlando as time expired in the 1st half. The ball was fielded off the net by P.J. Berry and returned 55-yards for a touchdown, increasing the Battle Wings' lead to 48–33. In the 2nd half, neither team had consecutive scores, and the Battle Wings came out on top with a 6-point win. Quarterback Raymond Philyaw threw for 9 touchdowns in the win, while P.J. Berry had 201 yards receiving and 7 total touchdowns.

=== Week 3: at Spokane Shock ===
Quarter	1	2	3	4	Total
Battle Wings	6	26	15	23	70
Shock	16	21	14	27	78

at Spokane Veterans Memorial Arena, Spokane, Washington

- Date: April 17
- Game time: 10:00 pm EDT
- Recap

Game information

1st quarter

- Bossier–Shreveport – Randy Hymes 29-yard pass from Raymond Philyaw (Art Carmody kick no good), 10:51
- Spokane – Markee White 14-yard pass from Kyle Rowley (Taylor Rowan kick), 7:32
- Spokane – Safety, 6:57
- Spokane – Eddie Thompson 1-yard run (Taylor Rowan kick), 0:23

2nd quarter

- Bossier–Shreveport – Kinsmon Lancaster 9-yard pass from Raymond Philyaw (Art Carmody kick), 10:11
- Spokane – Huey Whittaker 43-yard pass from Kyle Rowley (Taylor Rowan kick)
- Bossier–Shreveport – Willis Marshall 30-yard pass from Raymond Philyaw (Art Carmody kick), 8:20
- Bossier–Shreveport – P.J. Berry 14-yard pass from Raymond Philyaw (Art Carmody pass no good), 3:33
- Spokane – Kyle Rowley 1-yard run (Taylor Rowan kick), 0:58
- Bossier–Shreveport – Randy Hymes 6-yard pass from Raymond Philyaw (Art Carmody kick no good), 0:21
- Spokane – Raul Vijil 20-yard pass from Kyle Rowley (Taylor Rowan kick), 0:00

3rd quarter

- Bossier–Shreveport – Randy Hymes 13-yard pass from Raymond Philyaw (Art Carmody kick), 12:02
- Spokane – Markee White 7-yard pass from Kyle Rowley (Taylor Rowan kick), 9:34
- Bossier–Shreveport – P.J. Berry 28-yard pass from Raymond Philyaw (Randy Hymes pass), 8:28
- Spokane – Huey Whittaker 4-yard pass from Kyle Rowley (Taylor Rowan kick), 2:17

4th quarter

- Spokane – Markee White 6-yard pass from Kyle Rowley (Taylor Rowan kick), 12:04
- Spokane – Roderick Mosley 9-yard interception return (Taylor Rowan kick), 10:26
- Bossier–Shreveport – Randy Hymes 39-yard pass from Raymond Philyaw (Art Carmody pass no good), 6:55
- Spokane – Raul Vijil 41-yard pass from Kyle Rowley (Taylor Rowan kick) 5:01
- Bossier–Shreveport – Randy Hymes 18-yard pass from Raymond Philyaw (Art Carmody kick), 2:55
- Spokane – Huey Whittaker 5-yard pass from Kyle Rowley (Kyle Rowley pass no good), 0:44
- Bossier–Shreveport – Roshawn Marshall intercepted two-point conversion pass return, 0:44
- Bossier–Shreveport – Kinsmon Lancaster 9-yard pass from Raymond Philyaw (P.J. Berry pass), 0:33

Passing

- Bossier–Shreveport – Raymond Philyaw: 22/36, 349 yards, 10 TD, 1 INT
- Spokane – Kyle Rowley: 28/37, 316 yards, 8 TD, 1 INT

Rushing

- Bossier–Shreveport – Byron Douzart: 1 att, 4 yards
- Spokane – Eddie Thompson: 1 att, 1 yard, 1 TD

Receiving

- Bossier–Shreveport – Randy Hymes: 9 rec, 174 yards, 5 TD
- Spokane – Raul Vijil: 8 rec, 103 yards, 2 TD

The Battle Wings suffered their first loss of the season in a high-scoring game to the Shock. The game was very close until the 4th quarter when the Shock opened up a 65–47 lead in the 4th quarter, set up by two turnovers by Bossier–Shreveport. It was a deficit the Battle Wings could not overcome as they lost the game 78–70. Part of the loss was attributed to an injured P.J. Berry and the coverage put on him by Spokane's defense, forcing Raymond Philyaw to throw to other receivers, Randy Hymes in particular, who caught for 174 yards and 5 touchdowns. Philyaw finished with 349 yards and 10 touchdowns.

=== Week 5: at Utah Blaze ===
Quarter	1	2	3	4	Total
Battle Wings	14	6	13	13	46
Blaze	10	14	20	21	65

at E Center, West Valley City, Utah

- Date: April 30
- Game time: 9:05 pm EDT
- Game attendance: 4,256
- Recap

Game information

1st quarter

- Utah – Chris Francies 17-yard pass from Brett Elliott (Ben Scott kick), 12:16
- Bossier–Shreveport – Moqut Ruffins 18-yard pass from Raymond Philyaw (Art Carmody kick), 10:44
- Utah – Ben Scott 17-yard field goal, 6:12
- Bossier–Shreveport – P.J. Berry 5-yard pass from Raymond Philyaw (Art Carmody kick), 2:00

2nd quarter

- Utah – Aaron Boone 16-yard pass from Brett Elliott (Ben Scott kick), 14:20
- Bossier–Shreveport – Randy Hymes 7-yard pass from Raymond Philyaw (Art Carmody kick no good), 10:23
- Utah – Aaron Boone 4-yard pass from Brett Elliott (Ben Scott kick), 6:32

3rd quarter

- Utah – Wendall Williams 8-yard pass from Brett Elliott (Ben Scott kick no good), 11:55
- Bossier–Shreveport – P.J. Berry 7-yard pass from Raymond Philyaw (Art Carmody kick), 6:25
- Utah – Wendall Williams 9-yard pass from Brett Elliott (Ben Scott kick), 4:28
- Bossier–Shreveport – Kenyon Scott 23-yard pass from Raymond Philyaw (Art Carmody kick no good), 3:28
- Utah – Aaron Boone 6-yard pass from Brett Elliott (Ben Scott kick), 1:15

4th quarter

- Bossier–Shreveport – Byron Douzart 1-yard run (Raymond Philyaw run no good), 12:42
- Utah – Chris Francies 30-yard pass from Brett Elliott (Ben Scott kick), 5:18
- Utah – Brett Elliott 1-yard run (Ben Scott kick), 1:26
- Bossier–Shreveport – Randy Hymes 45-yard pass from Kinsmon Lancaster (Art Carmody kick no good), 0:52
- Utah – Chris Francies 9-yard kickoff return (Ben Scott kick), 0:50

Passing

- Bossier–Shreveport – Raymond Philyaw: 21/42, 229 yards, 5 TD, 1 INT
- Utah – Brett Elliott: 20/37, 237 yards, 7 TD

Rushing

- Bossier–Shreveport – Byron Douzart: 8 att, 49 yards, 1 TD
- Utah – Brett Elliott: 2 att, 4 yards, 1 TD

Receiving

- Bossier–Shreveport – Randy Hymes: 8 rec, 123 yards, 2 TD
- Utah – Chris Francies: 7 rec, 97 yards, 2 TD

Leading in just about every category statistically, the Battle Wings failed to outscore the Blaze, resulting in their second consecutive loss. Bossier–Shreveport's offense that night was stopped by Utah's defense on more than one occasion. Looking to take the lead in the 2nd quarter, down 4 points and just a few yards from the end zone on 4th down, the Battle Wings were given a new set of downs following a defensive pass interference penalty. Despite this, the Battle Wings were still unable to score, turning the ball over on downs. On the opening drive of the 3rd quarter, Raymond Philyaw was intercepted by Tour'e Carter, and Utah took advantage of the turnover with a touchdown on the ensuing drive. In the 4th quarter, the Battle Wings scored an early touchdown to cut the deficit to just 5 points. However on three of their final four drives, the Battle Wings turned the ball over on downs which resulted in the loss. Philyaw finished with 5 touchdowns and 229 yards, while Randy Hymes caught for 123 yards and 2 touchdowns.

=== Week 6: at Oklahoma City Yard Dawgz ===
Quarter	1	2	3	4	Total
Battle Wings	33	19	12	15	79
Yard Dawgz	14	27	21	26	88

at Cox Convention Center, Oklahoma City, Oklahoma

- Date: May 8
- Game time: 8:05 pm EDT
- Game attendance: 4,775
- Referee: Chris Sneed
- Recap^{[usurped]}

Game information

1st quarter

- Bossier–Shreveport – Randy Hymes 5-yard pass from Raymond Philyaw (Art Carmody kick), 13:16
- Oklahoma City – Al Hunt 13-yard pass from Tommy Grady (A.J. Haglund kick), 8:59
- Bossier–Shreveport – Randy Hymes 17-yard pass from Raymond Philyaw (Art Carmody kick), 7:16
- Bossier–Shreveport – Marvin Byrdsong 5-yard fumble return (Art Carmody kick), 6:29
- Bossier–Shreveport – Byron Douzart 2-yard run (Art Carmody kick no good), 3:04
- Oklahoma City – Anthony Hines 22-yard pass from Tommy Grady (A.J. Haglund kick), 2:05
- Bossier–Shreveport – Randy Hymes 41-yard pass from Raymond Philyaw (Art Carmody kick no good), 0:45

2nd quarter

- Oklahoma City – Al Hunt 5-yard pass from Tommy Grady (A.J. Haglund kick), 11:49
- Bossier–Shreveport – Randy Hymes 10-yard pass from Raymond Philyaw (Art Carmody kick no good), 8:05
- Oklahoma City – Al Hunt 38-yard pass from Tommy Grady (A.J. Haglund kick), 6:41
- Bossier–Shreveport – P.J. Berry 45-yard pass from Raymond Philyaw (Kinsmon Lancaster pass no good), 4:20
- Oklahoma City – Al Hunt 1-yard run (A.J. Haglund kick no good), 2:12
- Bossier–Shreveport – Randy Hymes 29-yard pass from Raymond Philyaw (Art Carmody kick), 1:00
- Oklahoma City – Craig Fulton Jr. 29-yard pass from Tommy Grady (A.J. Haglund kick), 0:22

3rd quarter

- Bossier–Shreveport – PJ Berry 11-yard pass from Raymond Philyaw (Art Carmody run no good), 13:08
- Oklahoma City – Anthony Hines 8-yard pass from Tommy Grady (A.J. Haglund kick), 10:12
- Oklahoma City – Anthony Hines 8-yard pass from Tommy Grady (A.J. Haglund kick), 6:32
- Oklahoma City – Al Hunt 17-yard pass from Tommy Grady (A.J. Haglund kick), 4:02
- Bossier–Shreveport – P.J. Berry 27-yard pass from Raymond Philyaw (Kinsmon Lancaster pass no good), 1:17

4th quarter

- Bossier–Shreveport – Byron Douzart 20-yard run (P.J. Berry run), 10:47
- Oklahoma City – Craig Fulton Jr. 11-yard pass from Tommy Grady (A.J. Haglund kick), 7:13
- Bossier–Shreveport – P.J. Berry 24-yard pass from Raymond Philyaw (Art Carmody kick), 2:52
- Oklahoma City – Anthony Hines 2-yard pass from Tommy Grady (A.J. Haglund kick no good), 0:33
- Oklahoma City – Timon Marshall 56-yard field goal return (A.J. Haglund kick), 0:04
- Oklahoma City – David Hyland 10-yard fumble return, 0:00

Passing

- Bossier–Shreveport – Raymond Philyaw: 29/38, 355 yards, 9 TD, 1 INT
- Oklahoma City – Tommy Grady: 34/42, 430 yards, 10 TD, 1 INT

Rushing

- Bossier–Shreveport – Byron Douzart: 3 att, 21 yards, 2 TD
- Oklahoma City – Chad Cook: 3 att, 29 yards

Receiving

- Bossier–Shreveport – P.J. Berry: 12 rec, 173 yards, 4 TD
- Oklahoma City – Anthony Hines: 11 rec, 137 yards, 4 TD

In the highest scoring game in AFL history, tied with the New York Dragons and Carolina Cobras game in 2001, Bossier was up 79–76 when Timon Marshall returned a missed 22-yard field goal for a touchdown to win the game.

=== Week 7: vs. Tampa Bay Storm ===
Quarter	1	2	3	4	Total
Storm	6	14	7	21	48
Battle Wings	6	16	7	15	44

at CenturyTel Center, Bossier City, Louisiana

- Date: May 15
- Game time: 8:05 pm EDT
- Game attendance: 4,784
- Referee: Scott Vaughn
- Recap

Game information

1st quarter

- Bossier–Shreveport – P.J. Berry 36-yard pass from Raymond Philyaw (Nick Gatto kick no good), 4:29
- Tampa Bay – Tyrone Timmons 7-yard pass from Brett Dietz (Garrett Rivas kick no good), 2:31

2nd quarter

- Bossier–Shreveport – P.J. Berry 2-yard pass from Raymond Philyaw (Nick Gatto kick no good), 11:48
- Bossier–Shreveport – Nick Gatto 22-yard field goal, 7:48
- Tampa Bay – Terrence Royal 2-yard run (Garrett Rivas kick), 4:50
- Bossier–Shreveport – Byron Douzart 28-yard run (Nick Gatto kick), 2:32
- Tampa Bay – DeAndrew Rubin 3-yard pass from Brett Dietz (Garrett Rivas kick), 0:10

3rd quarter

- Tampa Bay – Terrence Royal 3-yard pass from Brett Dietz (Garrett Rivas kick), 6:00
- Bossier–Shreveport – Willis Marshall 3-yard run (Nick Gatto kick), 0:20

4th quarter

- Tampa Bay – DeAndrew Rubin 18-yard pass from Brett Dietz (Garrett Rivas kick), 10:59
- Bossier–Shreveport – Randy Hymes 48-yard pass from Raymond Philyaw (Randy Hymes pass), 9:14
- Tampa Bay – DeAndrew Rubin 27-yard pass from Brett Dietz (Garrett Rivas kick), 5:42
- Bossier–Shreveport – Willis Marshall 2-yard run (Nick Gatto kick), 1:00
- Tampa Bay – Tyrone Timmons 2-yard pass from Brett Dietz (Garrett Rivas kick), 0:13

Passing

- Tampa Bay – Brett Dietz: 34/41, 398 yards, 6 TD, 1 INT
- Bossier–Shreveport – Raymond Philyaw: 20/36, 245 yards, 3 TD, 2 INT

Rushing

- Tampa Bay – Terrence Royal: 6 att, 12 yards, 1 TD
- Bossier–Shreveport – Byron Douzart: 5 att, 74 yards, 1 TD

Receiving

- Tampa Bay – DeAndrew Rubin: 7 rec, 116 yards, 3 TD
- Bossier–Shreveport – Randy Hymes: 6 rec, 115 yards, 1 TD

=== Week 8: at Alabama Vipers ===
Quarter	1	2	3	4	Total
Battle Wings	13	0	6	0	19
Vipers	14	21	7	14	56

at Von Braun Center, Huntsville, Alabama

- Date: May 22
- Game time: 8:30 pm EDT
- Game attendance: 3,701
- Recap^{[usurped]}

Game information

1st quarter

- Alabama – Larry Shipp 9-yard run (Brian Jackson kick), 11:50
- Bossier–Shreveport – Christian Wise 14-yard pass from Randy Hymes (Nick Gatto kick no good), 7:25
- Bossier–Shreveport – Byron Douzart 18-yard pass from Randy Hymes (Nick Gatto kick), 6:55
- Alabama – C.J. Johnson 17-yard pass from Tony Colston (Brian Jackson kick), 2:31

2nd quarter

- Alabama – Dan Alexander 2-yard run (Brian Jackson kick), 13:19
- Alabama – Willie Quinne 3-yard pass from Tony Colston (Brian Jackson kick)
- Alabama – Tony Colston 2-yard run (Brian Jackson kick), 0:12

3rd quarter

- Alabama – C.J. Johnson 33-yard pass from Tony Colston (Brian Jackson kick), 5:41
- Bossier–Shreveport – Willis Marshall 34-yard pass from Randy Hymes (Nick Gatto kick no good), 6:55

4th quarter

- Alabama – Willie Quinne 20-yard pass from Tony Colston (Brian Jackson kick), 13:21
- Alabama – Willie Quinne 5-yard pass from Tony Colston (Brian Jackson kick), 2:08

Passing

- Bossier–Shreveport – Randy Hymes: 20/39, 221 yards, 3 TD, 3 INT
- Alabama – Tony Colston: 17/25, 238 yards, 5 TD

Rushing

- Bossier–Shreveport – Randy Hymes: 4 att, 28 yards
- Alabama – Tony Colston: 4 att, 35 yards, 1 TD

Receiving

- Bossier–Shreveport – Willis Marshall: 11 rec, 131 yards, 1 TD
- Alabama – C.J. Johnson: 6 rec, 118 yards, 2 TD

=== Week 9: vs. Tulsa Shock ===
Quarter	1	2	3	4	Total
Talons	7	19	19	7	52
Battle Wings	7	19	14	8	48

at CenturyTel Center, Bossier City, Louisiana

- Date: May 29
- Game time: 8:05 pm EDT
- Game attendance: 3,173
- Referee: Scott Vaughn
- Recap

Game information

1st quarter

- Bossier–Shreveport – James Jordan 6-yard pass from Kinsmon Lancaster (Nick Gatto kick), 7:02
- Tulsa – Odie Armstrong 17-yard run (Tony Dodson kick), 3:14

2nd quarter

- Tulsa – Donovan Morgan 16-yard pass from Justin Allgood (Tony Dodson kick no good), 13:52
- Bossier–Shreveport – Willis Marshall 36-yard pass from Gary Cooper (Nick Gatto kick no good), 11:13
- Tulsa – Jeff Hughley 19-yard pass from Justin Allgood (Tony Dodson kick no good), 9:35
- Bossier–Shreveport – P.J. Berry 20-yard pass from Gary Cooper (Nick Gatto kick), 7:23
- Tulsa – Carlese Franklin 45-yard pass from Justin Allgood (Tony Dodson kick), 5:12
- Bossier–Shreveport – Randy Hymes 43-yard pass from Gary Cooper (Nick Gatto kick no good), 0:15

3rd quarter

- Tulsa – Donovan Morgan 5-yard pass from Justin Allgood no good), 12:35
- Bossier–Shreveport – James Jordan 14-yard pass from Gary Cooper (Nick Gatto kick), 9:43
- Tulsa – Donovan Morgan 19-yard pass from Justin Allgood (Carlese Franklin pass no good), 7:57
- Bossier–Shreveport – James Jordan 9-yard pass from Gary Cooper (Nick Gatto kick), 2:35
- Tulsa – Donovan Morgan 2-yard pass from Justin Allgood (Tony Dodson kick), 0:00

4th quarter

- Bossier–Shreveport – Willis Marshall 7-yard interception return (P.J. Berry pass), 10:52
- Tulsa – Jeff Hughley 40-yard pass from Justin Allgood (Tony Dodson kick), 9:24

Passing

- Tulsa – Justin Allgood: 16/34, 285 yards, 7 TD, 1 INT
- Bossier–Shreveport – Gary Cooper: 19/35, 275 yards, 5 TD, 1 INT

Rushing

- Tulsa – Odie Armstrong: 4 att, 55 yards, 1 TD
- Bossier–Shreveport – Kinsmon Lancaster: 1 att, 16 yards

Receiving

- Tulsa – Donovan Morgan: 8 rec, 131 yards, 4 TD
- Bossier–Shreveport – James Jordan: 9 rec, 81 yards, 3 TD

=== Week 10: at Dallas Vigilantes ===
Quarter	1	2	3	4	Total
Battle Wings	21	13	14	22	70
Vigilantes	7	20	28	14	69

at American Airlines Center, Dallas, Texas

- Date: June 4
- Game time: 8:30 pm EDT
- Game attendance: 4,297
- Referee: Mark Windham
- Recap

Game information

1st quarter

- Bossier–Shreveport – Gus Tyson 3-yard run (Nick Gatto kick), 10:55
- Dallas – Derek Lee 18-yard pass from Collin Drafts (Mark Lewis kick), 5:35
- Bossier–Shreveport – Randy Hymes 19-yard pass from Gary Cooper (Nick Gatto kick), 1:29
- Bossier–Shreveport – Willis Marshall 22-yard interception return (Nick Gatto kick), 0:00

2nd quarters

- Dallas – Derek Lee 9-yard pass from Collin Drafts (Mark Lewis kick), 12:36
- Bossier–Shreveport – James Jordan 9-yard pass from Gary Cooper (Nick Gatto kick), 7:41
- Dallas – Collin Drafts 9-yard run (Mark Lewis kick), 4:08
- Dallas – Kenny Henderson 24-yard pass from Collin Drafts (Mark Lewis kick no good), 0:12
- Bossier–Shreveport – Randy Hymes 19-yard pass from Gary Cooper (Nick Gatto run no good), 0:00

3rd quarter

- Dallas – Kenny Henderson 7-yard pass from Collin Drafts (Mark Lewis kick), 13:55
- Bossier–Shreveport – P.J. Berry 19-yard pass from Gary Cooper (Nick Gatto kick), 11:29
- Dallas – Matt Fields 9-yard pass from Collin Drafts (Mark Lewis kick), 7:57
- Bossier–Shreveport – James Jordan 4-yard pass from Gary Cooper (Nick Gatto kick), 4:18
- Dallas – Matt Fields 9-yard pass from Collin Drafts (Mark Lewis kick), 2:08
- Dallas – Derek Lee 13-yard pass from Collin Drafts (Mark Lewis kick), 0:01

4th quarter

- Bossier–Shreveport – P.J. Berry 18-yard pass from Gary Cooper (Nick Gatto kick), 12:06
- Dallas – Matt Fields 22-yard pass from Collin Drafts (Mark Lewis kick), 9:23
- Dallas – Duke Pettijohn 14-yard fumble return (Mark Lewis kick), 6:51
- Bossier–Shreveport – Gary Cooper 1-yard run (Nick Gatto kick), 5:13
- Bossier–Shreveport – James Jordan 5-yard pass from Gary Cooper (James Jordan pass), 0:00

Passing

- Bossier–Shreveport – Gary Cooper: 32/41, 313 yards, 7 TD
- Dallas – Collin Drafts: 17/26, 191 yards, 8 TD, 1 INT

Rushing

- Bossier–Shreveport – Gus Tyson: 4 att, 13 yards, 1 TD
- Dallas – Josh White: 1 att, 20 yards

Receiving

- Bossier–Shreveport – Randy Hymes: 7 rec, 93 yards, 2 TD
- Dallas – Kenny Henderson: 7 rec, 74 yards, 2 TD

=== Week 11: vs. Iowa Barnstormers ===
Quarter	1	2	3	4	Total
Barnstormers	7	14	21	6	48
Battle Wings	7	21	7	7	42

at CenturyTel Center, Bossier City, Louisiana

- Date: June 12
- Game time: 8:05 pm EDT
- Game attendance: 3,477
- Referee: Scott Vaughn
- Recap

Game information

1st quarter

- Bossier–Shreveport – Randy Hymes 40-yard pass from Gary Cooper (Nick Gatto kick), 13:41
- Iowa – Todd Blythe 32-yard pass from Ryan Vena (Jeff Glas kick), 5:21

2nd quarter

- Bossier–Shreveport – P.J. Berry 3-yard run (Nick Gatto kick), 10:00
- Iowa – Ryan Vena 1-yard run (Jeff Glas kick), 8:02
- Iowa – Todd Blythe 5-yard pass from Ryan Vena (Jeff Glas kick), 1:00
- Bossier–Shreveport – James Jordan 25-yard pass from Gary Cooper (Nick Gatto kick blocked), 0:05
- Bossier–Shreveport – P.J. Berry 58-yard field goal return (P.J. Berry pass)

3rd quarter

- Iowa – Todd Blythe 21-yard pass from Ryan Vena (Jeff Glas kick), 12:40
- Bossier–Shreveport – Willis Marshall 14-yard pass from Gary Cooper (Nick Gatto kick), 6:51
- Iowa – Ryan Vena 5-yard run (Jeff Glas kick), 4:17
- Iowa – Tommy Ellingworth 27-yard pass from Ryan Vena (Jeff Glas kick), 2:50

4th quarter

- Bossier–Shreveport – James Jordan 8-yard pass from Gary Cooper (Nick Gatto kick), 10:49
- Iowa – Todd Blythe 20-yard pass from Ryan Vena (Jeff Glas kick no good), 0:24

Passing

- Iowa – Ryan Vena: 20/30, 250 yards, 5 TD, 2 INT
- Bossier–Shreveport – Gary Cooper: 32/49, 237 yards, 4 TD, 3 INT

Rushing

- Iowa – Ryan Vena: 5 att, 13 yards, 2 TD
- Bossier–Shreveport – P.J. Berry: 2 att, 4 yards, 1 TD

Receiving

- Iowa – Todd Blythe: 9 rec, 127 yards, 4 TD
- Bossier–Shreveport – P.J. Berry: 12 rec, 111 yards

=== Week 12: at Arizona Rattlers ===
Quarter	1	2	3	4	Total
Battle Wings	7	28	7	8	50
Rattlers	23	21	14	21	79

at US Airways Center, Phoenix, Arizona

- Date: June 19
- Game time: 10:30 pm EDT
- Game attendance: 10,217
- Referee: Shawn Hochuli
- Recap

Game information

1st quarter

- Arizona – Windsor 37-yard pass from Nick Davila (Fabrizio Scaccia kick), 13:46
- Arizona – Safety, 13:12
- Arizona – Tod Devoe 28-yard pass from Nick Davila (Fabrizio Scaccia kick), 10:25
- Bossier–Shreveport – Willis Marshall 30-yard pass from Gary Cooper (Nick Gatto kick), 5:22
- Arizona – J.J. McKelvey 27-yard pass from Nick Davila (Fabrizio Scaccia kick), 3:45

2nd quarter

- Bossier–Shreveport – James Jordan 8-yard pass from Gary Cooper (Nick Gatto kick)
- Bossier–Shreveport – Christian Wise 9-yard pass from Gary Cooper (Nick Gatto kick), 12:39
- Arizona – Rod Windsor 30-yard pass from Nick Davila (Fabrizio Scaccia kick no good), 9:18
- Bossier–Shreveport – Willis Marshall 38-yard pass from Gary Cooper (Nick Gatto kick), 7:31
- Arizona – Rod Windsor 29-yard pass from Nick Davila (Fabrizio Scaccia kick), 4:50
- Arizona – J.J. McKelvey 10-yard pass from Nick Davila (Billy Farris run), 1:25
- Bossier–Shreveport – P.J. Berry 19-yard pass from Gary Cooper (Nick Gatto kick), 0:24

3rd quarter

- Bossier–Shreveport – P.J. Berry 13-yard pass from Gary Cooper (Nick Gatto kick), 10:41
- Arizona – J.J. McKelvey 27-yard pass from Nick Davila (Fabrizio Scaccia kick), 8:58
- Arizona – Rod Windsor 9-yard pass from Nick Davila (Fabrizio Scaccia kick), 1:45

4th quarter

- Arizona – Rod Windsor 9-yard pass from Nick Davila (Fabrizio Scaccia kick), 14:55
- Bossier–Shreveport – P.J. Berry 1-yard pass from Gary Cooper (James Jordan pass), 10:52
- Arizona – Rod Windsor 15-yard pass from Billy Farris (Fabrizio Scaccia kick), 8:52
- Arizona – Rod Windsor 7-yard pass from Billy Farris (Fabrizio Scaccia kick), 3:49

Passing

- Bossier–Shreveport – Gary Cooper: 23/39, 264 yards, 7 TD, 1 INT
- Arizona – Nick Davila: 20/26, 319 yards, 9 TD

Rushing

- Bossier–Shreveport – Byron Douzart: 3 att, 5 yards
- Arizona – John Booker: 4 att, 6 yards

Receiving

- Bossier–Shreveport – Willis Marshall: 6 rec, 115 yards, 2 TD
- Arizona – Rod Windsor: 10 rec, 157 yards, 7 TD

=== Week 13: at Tampa Bay Storm ===
Quarter	1	2	3	4	Total
Battle Wings	13	14	0	12	39
Storm	14	30	20	14	78

at St. Pete Times Forum, Tampa, Florida

- Date: June 25
- Game time: 8:00 pm EDT
- Game attendance: 15,808
- Referee: Kevin Stine
- Recap

Game information

1st quarter

- Bossier–Shreveport – PJ Berry 26-yard pass from Jimmy Welker (PJ Berry run no good), 11:53
- Tampa Bay – Hank Edwards 32-yard pass from Brett Dietz (Garrett Rivas kick), 8:53
- Bossier–Shreveport – James Jordan 28-yard pass from Jimmy Welker (Nick Gatto kick), 6:12
- Tampa Bay – DeAndrew Rubin 28-yard pass from Brett Dietz (Garrett Rivas kick), 1:06

2nd quarter

- Bossier–Shreveport – Jason Schule 24-yard run (Nick Gatto kick), 12:55
- Tampa Bay – Tyrone Timmons 33-yard pass from Brett Dietz (Garrett Rivas kick), 12:06
- Tampa Bay – Safety, 9:59
- Tampa Bay – Tyrone Timmons 17-yard pass from Brett Dietz (Garrett Rivas kick), 7:46
- Bossier–Shreveport – Christian Wise 34-yard pass from Jimmy Welker (Nick Gatto kick), 4:00
- Tampa Bay – Terrence Royal 1-yard run (Garrett Rivas kick), 2:02
- Tampa Bay – Hank Edwards 14-yard pass from Brett Dietz (Garrett Rivas kick), 0:06

3rd quarter

- Tampa Bay – Michael Hawthorne 0-yard fumble return (Garrett Rivas kick), 8:38
- Tampa Bay – Tyrone Timmons 14-yard pass from Brett Dietz (Garrett Rivas kick no good), 5:13
- Tampa Bay – Tyrone Timmons 8-yard pass from Brett Dietz (Garrett Rivas kick), 2:00

4th quarter

- Bossier–Shreveport – P.J. Berry 28-yard pass from Jimmy Welker (Nick Gatto kick blocked)
- Tampa Bay – Tyrone Timmons 11-yard pass from Brett Dietz (Garrett Rivas kick), 11:01
- Tampa Bay – Hank Edwards 24-yard pass from Drew Weatherford (Garrett Rivas kick), 4:42
- Bossier–Shreveport – Jason Schule 1-yard run (Nick Gatto kick blocked), 0:55

Passing

- Bossier–Shreveport – Jimmy Welker: 14/33, 239 yards, 4 TD, 3 INT
- Tampa Bay – Brett Dietz: 22/30, 342 yards, 8 TD

Rushing

- Bossier–Shreveport – Jason Schule: 4 att, 30 yards, 2 TD
- Tampa Bay – Terrence Royal: 5 att, 10 yards, 1 TD

Receiving

- Bossier–Shreveport – P.J. Berry: 4 rec, 72 yards, 2 TD
- Tampa Bay – Hank Edwards: 10 rec, 209 yards, 3 TD

=== Week 14: vs. Oklahoma City Yard Dawgz ===
Quarter	1	2	3	4	Total
Yard Dawgz	7	28	14	21	70
Battle Wings	14	10	7	13	44

at CenturyTel Center, Bossier City, Louisiana

- Date: July 3
- Game time: 8:05 pm EDT
- Game attendance: 3,382
- Referee: Scott Vaughn
- Recap

=== Week 15: at Tulsa Talons ===
Quarter	1	2	3	4	Total
Battle Wings	10	21	0	14	45
Talons	14	20	27	13	74

at BOK Center, Tulsa, Oklahoma

- Date: July 10
- Game time: 8:00 pm EDT

Game information

1st quarter

- Bossier–Shreveport – Nick Gatto 35-yard field goal, 10:54
- Tulsa – Donovan Morgan 26-yard pass from Michael Potts (Marco Capozzoli kick), 9:48
- Bossier–Shreveport – P.J. Berry 7-yard pass from Jimmy Welker (Nick Gatto kick), 6:04
- Tulsa – Donovan Morgan 6-yard pass from Justin Allgood (Marco Capozzoli kick), 3:17

2nd quarter

- Tulsa – Carlese Franklin 22-yard pass from Justin Allgood (Marco Capozzoli kick no good), 12:22
- Bossier–Shreveport – Jason Schule 2-yard run (Nick Gatto kick), 8:36
- Tulsa – Donovan Morgan 24-yard pass from Justin Allgood (Marco Capozzoli kick), 5:22
- Bossier–Shreveport – Kinsmon Lancaster 35-yard pass from Jimmy Welker (Nick Gatto kick), 4:17
- Tulsa – Donovan Morgan 16-yard pass from Justin Allgood (Marco Capozzoli kick), 1:52
- Bossier–Shreveport – P.J. Berry 5-yard pass from Jimmy Welker (Nick Gatto kick), 0:00

3rd quarter

- Tulsa – Carlese Franklin 2-yard pass from Justin Allgood (Marco Capozzoli kick), 10:52
- Tulsa – Donovan Morgan 45-yard pass from Justin Allgood (Marco Capozzoli kick no good), 7:49
- Tulsa – Odie Armstrong 1-yard run (Marco Capozzoli kick), 3:50
- Tulsa – Adam Huebner 0-yard fumble return (Marco Capozzoli kick), 1:17

4th quarter

- Tulsa – Carlese Franklin 6-yard pass from Justin Allgood (Marco Capozzoli kick no good), 11:37
- Bossier–Shreveport – James Jordan 14-yard pass from Jimmy Welker (Nick Gatto kick), 8:00
- Tulsa – Jeff Hughley 21-yard pass from Michael Potts (Marco Capozzoli kick), 5:21
- Bossier–Shreveport – Kinsmon Lancaster 10-yard run (Nick Gatto kick), 1:00

Passing

- Bossier–Shreveport – Jimmy Welker: 24/44, 239 yards, 4 TD, 2 INT
- Tulsa – Justin Allgood: 15/25, 223 yards, 7 TD, 1 INT

Rushing

- Bossier–Shreveport – Kinsmon Lancaster: 1 att, 10 yards, 1 TD
- Tulsa – Odie Armstrong: 7 att, 27 yards, 1 TD

Receiving

- Bossier–Shreveport – P.J. Berry: 9 rec, 81 yards, 2 TD
- Tulsa – Donovan Morgan: 9 rec, 180 yards, 5 TD

=== Week 17: vs. Jacksonville Sharks ===
Quarter	1	2	3	4	Total
Sharks	13	6	14	15	48
Battle Wings	13	7	0	0	20

at CenturyTel Center, Bossier City, Louisiana

- Date: July 24
- Game time: 8:05 pm EDT
- Game attendance: 6,015
- Referee: Scott Vaughn
- Recap

Game information

1st quarter

- Bossier–Shreveport – Kinsmon Lancaster 23-yard pass from Jimmy Welker (Nick Gatto kick no good), 10:50
- Jacksonville – Jason Willis 24-yard pass from Bernard Morris (Paul Edinger kick no good), 9:02
- Bossier–Shreveport – Kinsmon Lancaster 7-yard pass from Jimmy Welker (Nick Gatto kick), 4:23
- Jacksonville – Kirby Griffin 8-yard run (Paul Edinger kick), 0:50

2nd quarter

- Bossier–Shreveport – Moqut Ruffins 14-yard pass from Jimmy Welker (Nick Gatto kick), 8:51
- Jacksonville – Bernard Morris 24-yard run (Paul Edinger kick no good), 6:25

3rd quarter

- Jacksonville – Kirby Griffin 1-yard run (Paul Edinger kick), 8:45
- Jacksonville – Irving Campbell 6-yard pass from Bernard Morris (Paul Edinger kick), 3:13

4th quarter

- Jacksonville – Dallas Baker 34-yard pass from Bernard Morris (Paul Edinger kick no good), 10:50
- Jacksonville – Safety, 8:52
- Jacksonville – Kirby Griffin 3-yard run (Paul Edinger kick), 3:56

Passing

- Jacksonville – Bernard Morris: 19/25, 228 yards, 3 TD
- Bossier–Shreveport – Jimmy Welker: 11/17, 107 yards, 3 TD

Rushing

- Jacksonville – Bernard Morris: 5 att, 42 yards, 1 TD
- Bossier–Shreveport – Jason Schule: 5 att, 16 yards

Receiving

- Jacksonville – Irving Campbell: 9 rec, 103 yards, 1 TD
- Bossier–Shreveport – Kinsmon Lancaster: 6 rec, 57 yards, 2 TD

=== Week 18: vs. Dallas Vigilantes ===
Quarter	1	2	3	4	Total
Vigilantes	7	7	21	27	62
Battle Wings	14	14	7	21	56

at CenturyTel Center, Bossier City, Louisiana

- Date: July 31
- Game time: 8:05 pm EDT
- Game attendance: 4,417
- Referee: Scott Vaughn
- Recap

Game information

1st quarter

- Bossier–Shreveport – James Jordan 14-yard pass from Kinsmon Lancaster (Nick Gatto kick), 11:52
- Bossier–Shreveport – James Jordan 3-yard pass from Kinsmon Lancaster (Nick Gatto kick), 6:53
- Dallas – Matt Fields 14-yard pass from Daniel Raudabaugh (Mark Lewis kick), 5:12

2nd quarter

- Bossier–Shreveport – Jason Schule 3-yard run (Nick Gatto kick), 9:45
- Dallas – Larry Brackins 5-yard pass from Daniel Raudabaugh (Mark Lewis kick), 0:59
- Bossier–Shreveport – James Jordan 19-yard pass from Kinsmon Lancaster (Nick Gatto kick), 0:05

3rd quarter

- Dallas – Derek Lee 37-yard pass from Daniel Raudabaugh (Mark Lewis kick), 11:43
- Dallas – Derek Lee 20-yard pass from Daniel Raudabaugh (Mark Lewis kick), 7:31
- Bossier–Shreveport – Kinsmon Lancaster 5-yard run (Nick Gatto kick), 3:19
- Dallas – Kenny Henderson 44-yard pass from Daniel Raudabaugh (Mark Lewis kick), 0:05

4th quarter

- Dallas – Derek Lee 10-yard interception return (Mark Lewis kick), 13:37
- Dallas – Derek Lee 24-yard pass from Daniel Raudabaugh (Mark Lewis kick), 9:24
- Bossier–Shreveport – P.J. Berry 6-yard pass from Kinsmon Lancaster (Nick Gatto kick), 7:29
- Dallas – Phil Bogle 6-yard pass from Daniel Raudabaugh (Mark Lewis kick no good), 1:26
- Bossier–Shreveport – Kinsmon Lancaster 43-yard run (Nick Gatto kick), 0:57
- Dallas – Kenny Henderson 25-yard pass from Daniel Raudabaugh (Mark Lewis kick), 0:43
- Bossier–Shreveport – James Jordan 47-yard pass from Kinsmon Lancaster (Nick Gatto kick), 0:32

Passing

- Dallas – Daniel Raudabaugh: 22/29, 228 yards, 3 TD, 1 INT
- Bossier–Shreveport – Kinsmon Lancaster: 22/38, 233 yards, 5 TD, 1 INT

Rushing

- Dallas – Tommy Taggart: 2 att, 2 yards
- Bossier–Shreveport – Kinsmon Lancaster: 6 att, 65 yards, 2 TD

Receiving

- Dallas – Kenny Henderson: 9 att, 146 yards, 2 TD
- Bossier–Shreveport – James Jordan: 10 att, 140 yards, 4 TD
