= 2010 Oklahoma City Yard Dawgz season =

American football season

- Owner: Phil Miller
- General manager: Christie Cook
- Head coach: Sparky McEwen
- Home stadium: Cox Convention Center

Results
- Record: 6–10
- Division place: 2nd AC Southwest
- Playoffs: did not qualify

The 2010 Oklahoma City Yard Dawgz season is the 7th season for the franchise, and the first in the Arena Football League, coming from the AF2, which dissolved following the 2009 season. The team was coached by Sparky McEwen and played their home games at the Cox Convention Center. The Yard Dawgz did not qualify for the postseason after finishing with a 6–10 record and placing 6th in the American Conference.

== Standings ==
Southwest Division
Team	W	L	PCT	PF	PA	DIV	CON	Home	Away
y-Tulsa Talons	10	6	.625	994	899	6–0	9–2	6–2	4–4
Oklahoma City Yard Dawgz	6	10	.375	833	870	3–3	4–6	5–3	1–7
Dallas Vigilantes	3	13	.187	800	920	2–4	2–9	1–7	2–6
Bossier–Shreveport Battle Wings	3	13	.187	799	1030	1–5	3–9	2–6	1–7

y - Clinched division

== Regular season schedule ==
The Yard Dawgz began the season at home against the Sharks on April 3. They hosted the Talons in their final regular season game.

Week	Date	Time	Opponent	Result	Record	Venue	Source
1	April 3	7:05 pm	Jacksonville Sharks	**L** 38–54	0–1	Cox Convention Center	Recap
2	Bye						
3	April 17	7:05 pm	Cleveland Gladiators	**W** 63–50	1–1	Cox Convention Center	Recap
4	April 24	7:05 pm	at Iowa Barnstormers	**L** 60–68	1–2	Wells Fargo Arena	Recap
5	April 30	7:30 pm	at **Dallas Vigilantes**	**L** 34–55	1–3	American Airlines Center	Recap
6	May 8	7:05 pm	**Bossier–Shreveport Battle Wings**	**W** 88–79	2–3	Cox Convention Center	Recap
7	May 16	2:05 pm	Spokane Shock	**L** 63–68	2–4	Cox Convention Center	Recap
8	May 22	7:00 pm	at **Tulsa Talons**	**L** 41–67	2–5	BOK Center	Recap
9	May 28	7:05 pm	Alabama Vipers	**W** 65–39	3–5	Cox Convention Center	Recap
10	June 5	6:30 pm	at Tampa Bay Storm	**L** 48–50	3–6	St. Pete Times Forum	Recap
11	June 11	9:30 pm	at Arizona Rattlers	**L** 55–56	3–7	US Airways Center	Recap
12	Bye						
13	June 26	7:05 pm	**Dallas Vigilantes**	**W** 35–31	4–7	Cox Convention Center	Recap
14	July 3	7:05 pm	at **Bossier–Shreveport Battle Wings**	**W** 70–44	5–7	CenturyTel Center	Recap
15	July 10	7:05 pm	Iowa Barnstormers	**W** 52–42	6–7	Cox Convention Center	Recap
16	July 17	6:00 pm	at Cleveland Gladiators	**L** 39–44	6–8	Quicken Loans Arena	Recap
17	July 24	6:30 pm	at Orlando Predators	**L** 21–49	6–9	Amway Arena	Recap
18	July 30	7:05 pm	**Tulsa Talons**	**L** 61–74	6–10	Cox Convention Center	Recap

Note: Intra-division opponents are in bold text. All times are CDT

== Roster ==
Oklahoma City Yard Dawgz roster
Quarterbacks: 15 Tommy Grady; Fullbacks: 37 Chad Cook; Wide receivers: 7 Craig Fulton, Jr.; 3 Anthony Hines; 12 Al Hunt; 2 Xavier Lee QB; 5 Timon Marshall; 9 Alvance Robinson	Offensive linemen: 69 Jeremy Ashcraft; 75 Howard Duncan; 58 Markus Ferguson; Defensive linemen: 18 Dustin Barno DE; 93 Mkristo Bruce; 99 Mondre Dickerson DT/OL; 91 Quartez Vickerson	Linebackers: 13 Aaron Chavers; 1 Kevin McCullough; 6 Brandon Perkins; Defensive backs: 11 Mike Brown; 17 Sergio Gilliam; 23 Tristan Solo; 25 David Hyland; 8 Fred Shaw; Kickers: 10 A.J. Haglund	Injured reserve: -- C. J. McLain FB; Exempt list: -- Kelly Butler OL CFL; Suspended list: 90 Mike Berry DL; -- Larry Dibbles DL; 88 Dan Loney C/LS; 78 Kevin Myers OL/DT; 55 Erik Robertson OL; 23 Freddie Rollins FB; 6 Antwone Savage WR; Rookies in italics; Roster updated June 10, 2010; 23 Active, 9 Inactive

== Regular season ==
=== Week 1: vs. Jacksonville Sharks ===
Quarter	1	2	3	4	Total
Sharks	6	7	21	20	54
Yard Dawgz	7	3	7	21	38

at Cox Convention Center, Oklahoma City, Oklahoma

- Date: April 3
- Game time: 8:05 pm EDT
- Game attendance: 5,542
- Referee: Chris Snead
- Recap

Game information

1st quarter

- Oklahoma City – Al Hunt 5-yard pass from Tommy Grady (A.J. Haglund kick), 9:47
- Jacksonville – Jomo Wilson 40-yard pass from Aaron Garcia (Paul Edinger kick no good), 8:31

2nd quarter

- Jacksonville – Jomo Wilson 2-yard run (Paul Edinger kick), 5:53
- Oklahoma City – A.J. Haglund 10-yard field goal, 0:08

3rd quarter

- Jacksonville – Jason Willis 21-yard pass from Aaron Garcia (Paul Edinger kick), 12:38
- Oklahoma City – Timon Marshall 24-yard pass from Tommy Grady (A.J. Haglund kick), 8:50
- Jacksonville – Jeron Harvey 36-yard pass from Aaron Garcia (Paul Edinger kick), 6:58
- Jacksonville – Jason Willis 22-yard pass from Aaron Garcia (Paul Edinger kick), 3:08

4th quarter

- Oklahoma City – Timon Marshall 9-yard pass from Tommy Grady (A.J. Haglund kick), 13:41
- Jacksonville – Jeron Harvey 5-yard pass from Aaron Garcia (Paul Edinger kick), 10:08
- Jacksonville – Jason Perry 0-yard kickoff return (Paul Edinger kick), 8:11
- Oklahoma City – Anthony Hines 10-yard pass from Tommy Grady (A.J. Haglund pass no good), 6:39
- Oklahoma City – David Hyland 54-yard interception return (Freddie Rollins pass), 4:01
- Jacksonville – Jeron Harvey 14-yard kickoff return (Kirby Griffin pass no good), 3:27

Passing

- Jacksonville – Aaron Garcia: 11/16, 154 yards, 5 TD, 1 INT
- Oklahoma City – Tommy Grady: 22/34, 219 yards, 4 TD, 1 INT

Rushing

- Jacksonville – Kirby Griffin: 4 att, 17 yards
- Oklahoma City – Freddie Rollins: 3 att, 0 yards

Receiving

- Jacksonville – Jeron Harvey: 5 rec, 74 yards, 2 TD
- Oklahoma City – Timon Marshall: 6 rec, 63 yards, 2 TD

The game did not feature many scores by either team in the first two quarters, but when the Sharks began to build a lead following halftime, and the Yard Dawgz were down 34–17 at the start of the 4th quarter. Their attempt at a comeback fell short after an onside kick was returned for a touchdown by Jacksonville late in the final period. Quarterback Tommy Grady threw for 219 yards, however the total offense for the Yard Dawgz was only 202 yards.

=== Week 3: vs. Cleveland Gladiators ===
Quarter	1	2	3	4	Total
Gladiators	7	24	0	19	50
Yard Dawgz	0	28	14	21	63

at Cox Convention Center, Oklahoma City, Oklahoma

- Date: April 17
- Game time: 8:05 pm EDT
- Recap

Game information

1st quarter

- Cleveland – Brent Holmes 9-yard pass from John Dutton (Matt Denny kick), 2:55

2nd quarter

- Cleveland – Ryan Stanchek 5-yard pass from John Dutton (Matt Denny kick), 13:04
- Oklahoma City – Timon Marshall 58-yard kickoff return (A.J. Haglund kick), 12:10
- Cleveland – Ben Nelson 17-yard pass from John Dutton (Matt Denny kick), 9:43
- Oklahoma City – Al Hunt 1-yard run (A.J. Haglund kick), 7:30
- Oklahoma City – Al Hunt 1-yard run (A.J. Haglund kick), 2:31
- Cleveland – Ben Nelson 11-yard pass from John Dutton (Matt Denny kick), 0:54
- Oklahoma City – Kelly Butler 10-yard pass from Tommy Grady (A.J. Haglund kick), 0:29
- Cleveland – Matt Denny 28-yard field goal, 0:00

3rd quarter

- Oklahoma City – Al Hunt 1-yard run (A.J. Haglund kick), 11:10
- Oklahoma City – Timon Marshall 28-yard pass from Tommy Grady (A.J. Haglund kick), 7:06

4th quarter

- Oklahoma City – Al Hunt 33-yard pass from Tommy Grady (A.J. Haglund kick), 10:57
- Cleveland – Ben Nelson 6-yard pass from John Dutton (Matt Denny kick), 8:47
- Oklahoma City – Al Hunt 12-yard pass from Tommy Grady (A.J. Haglund kick), 2:24
- Cleveland – Chris Johnson 39-yard pass from John Dutton (John Dutton pass no good), 1:56
- Oklahoma City – C.J. McLain 7-yard run (A.J. Haglund kick), 0:55
- Cleveland – Chris Johnson 2-yard pass from John Dutton (Matt Denny kick blacked), 0:22

Passing

- Cleveland – John Dutton: 35/50, 309 yards, 7 TD, 1 INT
- Oklahoma City – Tommy Grady: 20/33, 276 yards, 4 TD

Rushing

- Cleveland – T.J. Watkins: 1 att, 8 yards
- Oklahoma City – C.J. McLain: 5 att, 27 yards, 1 TD

Receiving

- Cleveland – Chris Johnson: 13 rec, 133 yards, 2 TD
- Oklahoma City – Timon Marshall: 5 rec, 67 yards, 1 TD

Cleveland scored the first and only touchdown of the 1st quarter, but in the 2nd quarter the teams combined for 52 points. The Gladiators opened the 2nd quarter scoring with a 5-yard touchdown pass, but the Yard Dawgz took the ensuing kickoff back for a touchdown. With under a minute left in the 2nd quarter, the Gladiators scored on an 11-yard touchdown pass to take a 28–21 lead. The Yard Dawgz followed with a quick touchdown drive of their own that was capped off by a 10-yard passing touchdown to tie the game. With little time remaining in the half, the Matt Denny kicked a 28-yard field goal to give the Gladiators a 31–28 lead at halftime. The Yard Dawgz took control of the game in the 3rd quarter with a pair of touchdowns and never looked back, earning their first win of the season with a 63–50 win. Tommy Grady threw for 276 yards and 4 touchdowns. Al Hunt had 3 rushing touchdowns on 5 carries, but actually finished the game with a total of −1 yard.

=== Week 4: at Iowa Barnstormers ===
Quarter	1	2	3	4	Total
Yard Dawgz	9	22	13	16	60
Barnstormers	13	14	13	28	68

at Wells Fargo Arena, Des Moines, Iowa

- Date: April 24
- Game time: 8:05 pm EDT
- Game attendance: 8,312
- Referee: Ron Torbert
- Recap

Game information

1st quarter

- Oklahoma City – Anthony Hines 15-yard pass from Tommy Grady (A.J. Haglund kick), 9:58
- Iowa – Todd Blythe 5-yard pass from Ryan Vena (Jeff Glas kick no good), 3:40
- Oklahoma City – Fred Shaw 16-yard blocked PAT return, 3:40
- Iowa – Larry Kendrick 1-yard fumble recovery (Jeff Glas kick), 2:53

2nd quarter

- Oklahoma City – Freddie Rollins 1-yard run (David Hyland pass no good), 12:15
- Iowa – Jesse Schmidt 24-yard pass from Ryan Vena (Jeff Glas kick), 10:45
- Oklahoma City – Al Hunt 11-yard pass from Tommy Grady (A.J. Haglund kick), 7:48
- Iowa – Ryan Vena 2-yard run (Jeff Glas kick), 3:02
- Oklahoma City – Anthony Hines 22-yard pass from Tommy Grady (A.J. Haglund kick), 0:38

3rd quarter

- Iowa – Jesse Schmidt 33-yard pass from Ryan Vena (Jeff Glas kick), 12:45
- Oklahoma City – Al Hunt 4-yard pass from Tommy Grady (A.J. Haglund kick), 9:25
- Oklahoma City – Mervin Brookins 44-yard fumble return (David Hyland pass no good), 6:43
- Iowa – Micah King 3-yard fumble return (Jeff Glas kick no good), 1:29

4th quarter

- Iowa – Jesse Schmidt 31-yard pass from Ryan Vena (Jeff Glas kick), 11:35
- Iowa – Ryan Vena 2-yard run (Jeff Glas kick), 6:02
- Oklahoma City – A.J. Haglund 17-yard field goal, 2:11
- Iowa – Ryan Vena 4-yard run (Jeff Glas kick), 6:02
- Oklahoma City – Freddie Rollins 3-yard pass from Tommy Grady (A.J. Haglund kick), 0:23
- Iowa – 11-yard onside kickoff return (Jeff Glas kick), 0:22
- Oklahoma City – Xavier Lee 5-yard pass from Tommy Grady (Tommy Grady pass no good), 0:00
- Oklahoma City – Tommy Grady: 31/44, 383 yards, 6 TD, 1 INT
- Iowa – Ryan Vena: 17/30, 217 yards, 4 TD

Rushing

- Oklahoma City – Freddie Rollins: 5 att, 16 yards, 1 TD
- Iowa – Ryan Vena: 5 att, 33 yards, 3 TD

Receiving

- Oklahoma City – Xavier Lee: 9 rec, 117 yards, 1 TD
- Iowa – Jesse Schmidt: 7 rec, 141 yards, 3 TD

Oklahoma was the first to score, a 15-yard touchdown reception by Anthony Hines. Iowa also scored a touchdown on their first possession, but the extra point was blocked by Quartez Vickerson. Vickerson lateraled the ball to Fred Shaw, who took it to the end zone for 2 points. On the ensuing kickoff, Oklahoma City's Craig Fulton Jr. fumbled during the return, and Larry Kendrick picked it up for the Barnstormers and scored a touchdown. By halftime, the Yard Dawgz led 31–27. They led by the same margin following the 3rd quarter. In the 4th quarter, the Yard Dawgz fell behind after giving up two touchdowns to the Barnstormers before scoring their first points of the quarter on an A.J. Haglund field goal. With less than a minute left, Iowa quarterback Ryan Vena ran in his second touchdown of the final period to put the Barnstormers up by 14. The Yard Dawgz engineered a 5-play, 35-yard drive resulting in a touchdown to cut the deficit to just 7-points with 23 seconds remaining. However, the onside kick attempt was returned for a touchdown by Iowa. Oklahoma City would score another touchdown, but with no time left on the clock, the game was over. Tommy Grady threw for 383 yards and 6 touchdowns. Xavier Lee led all receivers with 117 yards, but just 1 touchdown.

=== Week 5: at Dallas Vigilantes ===
Quarter	1	2	3	4	Total
Yard Dawgz	0	21	7	6	34
Vigilantes	20	21	7	7	55

at American Airlines Center, Dallas, Texas

- Date: April 30
- Game time: 8:30 pm EDT
- Game attendance: 7,051
- Referee: Mark Windham
- Recap

Game information

1st quarter

- Dallas – Larry Brackins 9-yard pass from Collin Drafts (Mark Lewis kick no good), 12:00
- Dallas – Josh White 4-yard run (Mark Lewis kick), 4:58
- Dallas – Kenny Henderson field goal return (Mark Lewis kick), 1:31

2nd quarter

- Oklahoma City – Timon Marshall 9-yard pass from Tommy Grady (A.J. Haglund kick), 9:10
- Oklahoma City – Timon Marshall 21-yard pass from Tommy Grady (A.J. Haglund kick), 5:07
- Oklahoma City – Aaron Chavers 38-yard fumble return (A.J. Haglund kick), 2:41
- Dallas – Derek Lee 13-yard pass from Collin Drafts (Mark Lewis kick), 0:49
- Dallas – Chris Brown 23-yard interception return (Mark Lewis kick)
- Dallas – Larry Brackins 25-yard pass from Collin Drafts (Mark Lewis kick), 0:02

3rd quarter

- Dallas – Derek Lee 8-yard pass from Collin Drafts (Mark Lewis kick), 9:54
- Oklahoma City – Timon Marshall 18-yard pass from Tommy Grady (AJ Haglund kick), 3:24

4th quarter

- Dallas – Collin Drafts 1-yard run (Mark Lewis kick), 11:41
- Oklahoma City – Anthony Hines 16-yard pass from Tommy Grady (Chad Cook run no good), 0:01
- Oklahoma City – Tommy Grady: 22/41, 205 yards, 4 TD, 1 INT
- Dallas – Collin Drafts: 18/35, 239 yards, 4 TD

Rushing

- Oklahoma City – Chad Cook: 2 att, 2 yards
- Dallas – Collin Drafts: 3 att, 3 yards, 1 TD

Receiving

- Oklahoma City – Timon Marshall: 9 rec, 88 yards, 3 TD
- Dallas – Larry Brackins: 7 rec, 111 yards, 2 TD

Oklahoma City fell behind 20–0 in the 1st quarter, but managed to take a 21–20 lead with less than 3 minutes left in the 2nd quarter. However, the Vigilantes scored 3 touchdowns in the final minute of the half, including intercepting one of Tommy Grady's passes and returning it for a touchdown. At halftime, the Yard Dawgz were losing 41–20. The 2nd half did not feature much scoring by either team, and the Yard Dawgz lost by a final score of 55–34. Oklahoma City was outgained in total offense 244–179. Grady threw only 4 touchdowns and had 205 passing yards in the game. Timon Marshall was one of six Yard Dawgz to receive a pass, leading all of them with 88 yards and 3 touchdowns.

=== Week 6: vs. Bossier–Shreveport Battle Wings ===
Quarter	1	2	3	4	Total
Battle Wings	33	19	12	15	79
Yard Dawgz	14	27	21	26	88

at Cox Convention Center, Oklahoma City, Oklahoma

- Date: May 8
- Game time: 8:05 pm EDT
- Game attendance: 4,775
- Referee: Chris Sneed
- Recap

Game information

1st quarter

- Bossier–Shreveport – Randy Hymes 5-yard pass from Raymond Philyaw (Art Carmody kick), 13:16
- Oklahoma City – Al Hunt 13-yard pass from Tommy Grady (A.J. Haglund kick), 8:59
- Bossier–Shreveport – Randy Hymes 17-yard pass from Raymond Philyaw (Art Carmody kick), 7:16
- Bossier–Shreveport – Marvin Byrdsong 5-yard fumble return (Art Carmody kick), 6:29
- Bossier–Shreveport – Byron Douzart 2-yard run (Art Carmody kick no good), 3:04
- Oklahoma City – Anthony Hines 22-yard pass from Tommy Grady (A.J. Haglund kick), 2:05
- Bossier–Shreveport – Randy Hymes 41-yard pass from Raymond Philyaw (Art Carmody kick no good), 0:45

2nd quarter

- Oklahoma City – Al Hunt 5-yard pass from Tommy Grady (A.J. Haglund kick), 11:49
- Bossier–Shreveport – Randy Hymes 10-yard pass from Raymond Philyaw (Art Carmody kick no good), 8:05
- Oklahoma City – Al Hunt 38-yard pass from Tommy Grady (A.J. Haglund kick), 6:41
- Bossier–Shreveport – P.J. Berry 45-yard pass from Raymond Philyaw (Kinsmon Lancaster pass no good), 4:20
- Oklahoma City – Al Hunt 1-yard run (A.J. Haglund kick no good), 2:12
- Bossier–Shreveport – Randy Hymes 29-yard pass from Raymond Philyaw (Art Carmody kick), 1:00
- Oklahoma City – Craig Fulton Jr. 29-yard pass from Tommy Grady (A.J. Haglund kick), 0:22

3rd quarter

- Bossier–Shreveport – PJ Berry 11-yard pass from Raymond Philyaw (Art Carmody run no good), 13:08
- Oklahoma City – Anthony Hines 8-yard pass from Tommy Grady (A.J. Haglund kick), 10:12
- Oklahoma City – Anthony Hines 8-yard pass from Tommy Grady (A.J. Haglund kick), 6:32
- Oklahoma City – Al Hunt 17-yard pass from Tommy Grady (A.J. Haglund kick), 4:02
- Bossier–Shreveport – P.J. Berry 27-yard pass from Raymond Philyaw (Kinsmon Lancaster pass no good), 1:17

4th quarter

- Bossier–Shreveport – Byron Douzart 20-yard run (P.J. Berry run), 10:47
- Oklahoma City – Craig Fulton Jr. 11-yard pass from Tommy Grady (A.J. Haglund kick), 7:13
- Bossier–Shreveport – P.J. Berry 24-yard pass from Raymond Philyaw (Art Carmody kick), 2:52
- Oklahoma City – Anthony Hines 2-yard pass from Tommy Grady (A.J. Haglund kick no good), 0:33
- Oklahoma City – Timon Marshall 56-yard field goal return (A.J. Haglund kick), 0:04
- Oklahoma City – David Hyland 10-yard fumble return, 0:00

Passing

- Bossier–Shreveport – Raymond Philyaw: 29/38, 355 yards, 9 TD, 1 INT
- Oklahoma City – Tommy Grady: 34/42, 430 yards, 10 TD, 1 INT

Rushing

- Bossier–Shreveport – Byron Douzart: 3 att, 21 yards, 2 TD
- Oklahoma City – Chad Cook: 3 att, 29 yards

Receiving

- Bossier–Shreveport – P.J. Berry: 12 rec, 173 yards, 4 TD
- Oklahoma City – Anthony Hines: 11 rec, 137 yards, 4 TD

=== Week 7: vs. Spokane Shock ===
Quarter	1	2	3	4	Total
Shock	7	24	14	23	68
Yard Dawgz	14	14	14	21	63

at Cox Convention Center, Oklahoma City, Oklahoma

- Date: May 16
- Game time: 3:05 pm EDT
- Game attendance: 4,415
- Recap

Game information

1st quarter

- Oklahoma City – Al Hunt 38-yard pass from Tommy Grady (A.J. Haglund kick), 8:45
- Spokane – Huey Whittaker 9-yard pass from Kyle Rowley (Taylor Rowan kick), 2:35
- Oklahoma City – Timon Marshall 56-yard kickoff return (A.J. Haglund kick), 1:43

2nd quarter

- Spokane – Shaun Kauleinamoku 21-yard pass from Kyle Rowley (Taylor Rowan kick), 14:16
- Spokane – Markee White 2-yard pass from Kyle Rowley (Taylor Rowan kick), 5:49
- Oklahoma City – Craig Fulton Jr. 4-yard pass from Tommy Grady (A.J. Haglund kick), 3:18
- Spokane – Huey Whittaker 2-yard pass from Kyle Rowley (Taylor Rowan kick), 0:34
- Oklahoma City – Timon Marshall 27-yard pass from Tommy Grady (A.J. Haglund kick), 0:24
- Spokane – Taylor Rowan 10-yard field goal, 0:04

3rd quarter

- Oklahoma City – Anthony Hines 19-yard pass from Tommy Grady (A.J. Haglund kick), 10:11
- Spokane – Quorey Payne 2-yard run (Taylor Rowan kick), 5:14
- Oklahoma City – Craig Fulton Jr. 13-yard pass from Tommy Grady (A.J. Haglund kick), 3:20
- Spokane – Shaun Kauleinamoku 25-yard pass from Kyle Rowley (Taylor Rowan kick), 0:27

4th quarter

- Oklahoma City – Al Hunt 7-yard pass from Tommy Grady (AJ Haglund kick), 14:19
- Spokane – Huey Whittaker 12-yard pass from Kyle Rowley (Taylor Rowan kick), 10:16
- Oklahoma City – Al Hunt 1-yard run (A.J. Haglund kick), 7:16
- Spokane – Branden Hall 8-yard pass from Kyle Rowley (Taylor Rowan kick), 4:12
- Spokane – Ben McCombs 0-yard fumble return (Taylor Rowan kick no good), 1:13
- Spokane – Taylor Rowan 11-yard field goal, 0:27
- Oklahoma City – Al Hunt 30-yard pass from Tommy Grady (A.J. Haglund kick), 0:23

Passing

- Spokane – Kyle Rowley: 28/54, 344 yards, 7 TD, 1 INT
- Oklahoma City – Tommy Grady: 21/31, 303 yards, 7 TD, 1 INT

Rushing

- Spokane – Quorey Payne: 4 att, 8 yards, 1 TD
- Oklahoma City – Chad Cook: 2 att, 8 yards

Receiving

- Spokane – Huey Whittaker: 13 rec, 152 yards, 3 TD
- Oklahoma City – Al Hunt: 5 rec, 110 yards, 3 TD

=== Week 8: at Tulsa Talons ===
Quarter	1	2	3	4	Total
Yard Dawgz	7	14	0	20	41
Talons	14	19	13	21	67

at BOK Center, Tulsa, Oklahoma

- Date: May 22
- Game time: 8:00 pm EDT
- Game attendance: 7,235
- Recap

Game information

1st quarter

- Tulsa – Carlese Franklin 6-yard run (Tony Dodson kick), 12:47
- Tulsa – Jeff Hughley 5-yard pass from Justin Allgood (Tony Dodson kick), 8:11
- Oklahoma City – Anthony Hines 27-yard pass from Tommy Grady (A.J. Haglund kick), 1:25

2nd quarter

- Tulsa – Carlese Franklin 14-yard pass from Justin Allgood (Tony Dodson pass interception), 5:17
- Oklahoma City – Chad Cook 3-yard run (AJ Haglund kick), 3:23
- Tulsa – Carlese Franklin 14-yard pass from Justin Allgood (Jeff Hughley run no good), 1:52
- Oklahoma City – Al Hunt 9-yard pass from Tommy Grady (A.J. Haglund kick), 0:20
- Tulsa – Donovan Morgan 34-yard pass from Justin Allgood (Tony Dodson kick), 0:07

3rd quarter

- Tulsa – Jeff Hughley 5-yard pass from Justin Allgood (Tony Dodson run no good), 8:20
- Tulsa – Carlese Franklin 3-yard run (Tony Dodson kick), 2:41

4th quarter

- Tulsa – Carlese Franklin 15-yard pass from Justin Allgood (Tony Dodson kick), 14:13
- Oklahoma City – Xavier Lee 1-yard run (Xavier Lee run no good), 5:12
- Tulsa – Michael Potts 1-yard run (Tony Dodson kick), 2:41
- Oklahoma City – Howard Duncan 3-yard pass from Xavier Lee (Al Hunt pass), 0:54
- Tulsa – LaRico Stevenson 9-yard kickoff return (Tony Dodson kick), 0:52
- Oklahoma City – Anthony Hines 3-yard pass from Xavier Lee (Al Hunt pass no good), 0:10
- Oklahoma City – Tommy Grady: 15/28, 171 yards, 2 TD, 1 INT
- Tulsa – Justin Allgood: 15/19, 178 yards, 6 TD

Rushing

- Oklahoma City – Xavier Lee: 3 att, 31 yards, 1 TD
- Tulsa – Odie Armstrong: 4 att, 38 yards

Receiving

- Oklahoma City – Anthony Hines: 7 rec, 93 yards, 2 TD
- Tulsa – Carlese Franklin: 5 rec, 62 yards, 3 TD

=== Week 9: vs. Alabama Vipers ===
Quarter	1	2	3	4	Total
Vipers	13	7	13	6	39
Yard Dawgz	16	16	13	20	65

at Cox Convention Center, Oklahoma City, Oklahoma

- Date: May 28
- Game time: 8:05 pm EDT
- Game attendance: 5,139
- Referee: Chris Sneed
- Recap

Game information

1st quarter

- Oklahoma City – Safety, 12:37
- Oklahoma City – Anthony Hines 17-yard pass from Tommy Grady (A.J. Haglund kick), 9:37
- Alabama – C.J. Johnson 55-yard kickoff return (Steve Azar kick), 9:37
- Oklahoma City – Al Hunt 2-yard run (A.J. Haglund kick), 5:22
- Alabama – C.J. Johnson 6-yard pass from Kevin Eakin (Steve Azar kick no good), 1:01

2nd quarter

- Alabama – Dan Alexander 6-yard run (Steve Azar kick), 13:12
- Oklahoma City – Timon Marshall 26-yard pass from Tommy Grady (David Hyland pass no good), 9:56
- Oklahoma City – A.J. Haglund 27-yard field goal, 1:00
- Oklahoma City – Chad Cook 3-yard run (A.J. Haglund kick), 0:02

3rd quarter

- Oklahoma City – David Hyland 0-yard kickoff return (A.J. Haglund kick), 14:30
- Alabama – Eric Scott 38-yard field goal return (Steve Azar kick no good), 9:13
- Oklahoma City – Al Hunt 3-yard run (A.J. Haglund kick no good), 4:19
- Alabama – Larry Shipp 43-yard pass from Kevin Eakin (Steve Azar kick), 2:19

4th quarter

- Oklahoma City – Anthony Hines 24-yard pass from Tommy Grady (A.J. Haglund pass no good), 14:06
- Oklahoma City – Collin Taylor 15-yard interception return (Tommy Grady pass no good), 12:15
- Oklahoma City – Kevin Myers 12-yard pass from Tommy Grady (Xavier Lee pass), 3:49
- Alabama – Tony Colston 3-yard run (Steve Azar kick no good), 1:31

Passing

- Alabama – Kevin Eakin: 10/19, 163 yards, 2 TD, 3 INT
- Oklahoma City – Tommy Grady: 24/38, 265 yards, 4 TD, 1 INT

Rushing

- Alabama – Tony Colston: 2 att, 10 yards, 1 TD
- Oklahoma City – Al Hunt: 2 att, 5 yards, 2 TD

Receiving

- Alabama – Larry Shipp: 7 rec, 148 yards, 1 TD
- Oklahoma City – Anthony Hines: 6 rec, 77 yards, 2 TD

=== Week 10: at Tampa Bay Storm ===
Quarter	1	2	3	4	Total
Yard Dawgz	7	14	14	13	48
Storm	14	14	13	9	50

at 7:30 pm EDT

- Date: June 5
- Game time: 7:30 pm EDT
- Game attendance: 16,200
- Referee: Kevin Stine
- Recap

Game information

1st quarter

- Oklahoma City – Timon Marshall 28-yard pass from Tommy Grady (Andy Eminger kick), 10:30
- Tampa Bay – Hank Edwards 14-yard pass from Brett Dietz (Garrett Rivas kick), 7:31
- Tampa Bay – DeAndrew Rubin 9-yard pass from Brett Dietz (Garrett Rivas kick), 0:24

2nd quarter

- Oklahoma City – Timon Marshall 34-yard pass from Tommy Grady (Andy Eminger kick), 13:24
- Tampa Bay – Hank Edwards 4-yard pass from Brett Dietz (Garrett Rivas kick), 7:31
- Tampa Bay – Tyrone Timmons 10-yard pass from Brett Dietz (Garrett Rivas kick), 1:00
- Oklahoma City – Al Hunt 2-yard run (Andy Eminger kick), 0:00

3rd quarter

- Oklahoma City – Anthony Hines 11-yard pass from Tommy Grady (Andy Eminger kick), 9:44
- Tampa Bay – Hank Edwards 19-yard pass from Brett Dietz (Garrett Rivas kick no good), 7:52
- Oklahoma City – Anthony Hines 10-yard pass from Tommy Grady (Andy Eminger kick), 5:24
- Tampa Bay – Hank Edwards 9-yard pass from Brett Dietz (Garrett Rivas kick), 1:00

4th quarter

- Oklahoma City – Kevin McCollough 46-yard interception return (Andy Eminger kick), 11:35
- Tampa Bay – Safety, 3:36
- Tampa Bay – Terrence Royal 40-yard run (Garrett Rivas kick), 2:30
- Oklahoma City – Chad Cook 3-yard run (Chad Cook run no good), 0:09

Passing

- Oklahoma City – Tommy Grady: 18/36, 192 yards, 4 TD
- Tampa Bay – Brett Dietz: 18/35, 226 yards, 6 TD, 2 INT

Rushing

- Oklahoma City – Chad Cook: 4 att, 17 yards, 1 TD
- Tampa Bay – Terrence Royal: 3 att, 43 yards, 1 TD

Receiving

- Oklahoma City – Timon Marshall: 6 rec, 87 yards, 2 TD
- Tampa Bay – Hank Edwards: 9 rec, 102 yards, 4 TD

=== Week 11: at Arizona Rattlers ===
Quarter	1	2	3	4	Total
Yard Dawgz	13	16	6	20	55
Rattlers	7	21	7	21	56

at US Airways Center, Phoenix, Arizona

- Date: June 11
- Game time: 10:30 pm EDT
- Game attendance: 10,115
- Referee: Shawn Hocholi
- Recap

=== Week 13: vs. Dallas Vigilantes ===
Quarter	1	2	3	4	Total
Vigilantes	0	17	7	7	31
Yard Dawgz	6	10	0	19	35

at Cox Convention Center, Oklahoma City, Oklahoma

- Date: June 26
- Game time: 8:05 pm EDT
- Game attendance: 5,114
- Referee: Chris Snead
- Recap

Game information

1st quarter

- Oklahoma City – Craig Fulton Jr. 18-yard pass from Tommy Grady (Michael Salerno kick no good), 9:35

2nd quarter

- Dallas – Brandon Pahula 3-yard fumble return (Mark Lewis kick), 13:43
- Dallas – Mark Lewis 15-yard field goal, 7:01
- Oklahoma City – Al Hunt 24-yard pass from Tommy Grady (Michael Salerno kick), 4:29
- Dallas – Matt Fields 26-yard pass from B.J. Hall (Mark Lewis kick), 0:41
- Oklahoma City – Michael Salerno 14-yard field goal, 0:01

3rd quarter

- Dallas – Matt Fields 31-yard pass from B.J. Hall (Mark Lewis kick), 3:23

4th quarter

- Oklahoma City – Xavier Lee 44-yard pass from Tommy Grady (Al Hunt run no good), 9:31
- Dallas – Matt Fields 19-yard pass from B.J. Hall (Mark Lewis kick), 5:29
- Oklahoma City – Chad Cook 1-yard run (Michael Salerno kick), 1:00
- Oklahoma City – Craig Fulton Jr. 24-yard pass from Tommy Grady (Al Hunt pass no good), 0:15

Passing

- Dallas – B.J. Hall: 25/39, 243 yards, 3 TD, 2 INT
- Oklahoma City – Tommy Grady: 26/56, 339 yards, 4 TD, 2 INT

Rushing

- Dallas – Duke Pettijohn: 2 att, 14 yards
- Oklahoma City – Chad Cook: 2 att, 2 yards, 1 TD

Receiving

- Dallas – Matt Fields: 9 rec, 123 yards, 3 TD
- Oklahoma City – Xavier Lee: 9 rec, 143 yards, 1 TD

=== Week 14: at Bossier–Shreveport Battle Wings ===
Quarter	1	2	3	4	Total
Yard Dawgz	7	28	14	21	70
Battle Wings	14	10	7	13	44

at CenturyTel Center, Bossier City, Louisiana

- Date: July 3
- Game time: 8:05 pm EDT
- Game attendance: 3,382
- Referee: Scott Vaughn
- Recap

=== Week 15: vs. Iowa Barnstormers ===
Quarter	1	2	3	4	Total
Barnstormers	7	14	7	14	42
Yard Dawgz	14	14	3	21	52

at Cox Convention Center, Oklahoma City, Oklahoma

- Date: July 10
- Game time: 8:05 pm EDT
- Game attendance: 5,415
- Referee: Ron Torbert
- Recap

Game information

1st quarter

- Iowa – Ryan Vena 1-yard run (Tanner Varner kick), 8:22
- Oklahoma City – Timon Marshall 14-yard pass from Tommy Grady (Michael Salerno kick), 4:40
- Oklahoma City – Fred Shaw 50-yard interception return (Michael Salerno kick), 0:20

2nd quarter

- Oklahoma City – Chad Cook 2-yard run (Michael Salerno kick), 8:49
- Iowa – Jesse Schmidt 5-yard pass from Ryan Vena (Jeff Glas kick), 4:24
- Iowa – Larry Kendrick 16-yard pass from Ryan Vena (Jeff Glas kick), 0:21
- Oklahoma City – Jerel Myers 13-yard pass from Tommy Grady (Michael Salerno kick), 0:02

3rd quarter

- Oklahoma City – Michael Salerno 15-yard field goal, 7:10
- Iowa – Larry Kendrick 18-yard pass from Ryan Vena (Jeff Glas kick), 2:07

4th quarter

- Oklahoma City – Timon Marshall 22-yard pass from Tommy Grady (Michael Salerno kick), 14:12
- Iowa – Larry Kendrick 24-yard pass from Ryan Vena (Jeff Glas kick), 13:06
- Oklahoma City – Jeremy Ashcroft 5-yard pass from Tommy Grady (Michael Salerno kick), 9:20
- Iowa – Jesse Schmidt 13-yard pass from Ryan Vena (Jeff Glas kick), 4:00
- Oklahoma City – Timon Marshall 26-yard pass from Tommy Grady (Michael Salerno kick), 0:56

Passing

- Iowa – Ryan Vena: 26/38, 310 yards, 5 TD, 2 INT
- Oklahoma City – Tommy Grady: 29/41, 291 yards, 5 TD

Rushing

- Iowa – Rodney Filer: 3 att, 22 yards
- Oklahoma City – Chad Cook: 8 att, 9 yards, 1 TD

Receiving

- Iowa – Larry Kendrick: 9 rec, 121 yards, 3 TD
- Oklahoma City – Timon Marshall: 13 rec, 151 yards, 3 TD

=== Week 16: at Cleveland Gladiators ===
Quarter	1	2	3	4	Total
Yard Dawgz	13	6	8	12	39
Gladiators	7	14	14	9	44

at Quicken Loans Arena, Cleveland Ohio

- Date: July 17
- Game time: 7:00 pm EDT
- Game attendance: 7,682
- Referee: Alex Kemp
- Recap

Game information

1st quarter

- Oklahoma City – Alvance Robinson 11-yard pass from Tommy Grady (Michael Salerno kick no good), 10:16
- Oklahoma City – Brandon Perkins 0-yard fumble return (Michael Salerno kick), 8:44
- Cleveland – Jermaine Lewis 4-yard pass from John Dutton (Matt Denny kick), 5:29

2nd quarter

- Cleveland – Brent Holmes 0-yard field goal return (Matt Denny kick), 14:08
- Cleveland – Michael Bragg 41-yard fumble return (Matt Denny kick), 9:18
- Oklahoma City – Xavier Lee 13-yard pass from Tommy Grady (Michael Salerno kick no good), 0:00

3rd quarter

- Cleveland – Jermaine Lewis 30-yard pass from John Dutton (Matt Denny kick), 13:52
- Oklahoma City – Xavier Lee 30-yard run (Jerel Myers pass), 2:09
- Cleveland – Victor Williams 21-yard pass from John Dutton (Matt Denny kick), 0:00

4th quarter

- Oklahoma City – Chad Cook 2-yard run (Michael Salerno kick no good), 10:17
- Cleveland – Matt Denny 12-yard field goal, 3:20
- Oklahoma City – Timon Marshall 8-yard pass from Xavier Lee (Chad Cook run no good), 1:00
- Cleveland – Victor Williams 45-yard pass from John Dutton (Victor Williams pass no good), 0:48
- Oklahoma City – Tommy Grady: 14/30, 159 yards, 2 TD, 2 INT
- Cleveland – John Dutton: 15/35, 242 yards, 4 TD

Rushing

- Oklahoma City – Xavier Lee: 1 att, 30 yards, 1 TD
- Cleveland – John Dutton and Victor Williams: 1 att, −1 yards

Receiving

- Oklahoma City – Timon Marshall: 6 rec, 66 yards, 1 TD
- Cleveland – Victor Williams: 6 rec, 132 yards, 2 TD

=== Week 17: at Orlando Predators ===
Quarter	1	2	3	4	Total
Yard Dawgz	7	0	14	0	21
Predators	21	14	7	7	49

at Amway Arena, Orlando, Florida

- Date: July 24
- Game time: 7:30 pm EDT
- Game attendance: 12,343
- Referee: Greg Lefils
- Recap

Game information

1st quarter

- Oklahoma City – Timon Marshall 15-yard pass from Tommy Grady (Michael Salerno kick), 12:39
- Orlando – Robert Quiroga 8-yard pass from Nick Hill (Carlos Martinez kick), 9:22
- Orlando – Bobby Sippio 27-yard pass from Nick Hill (Carlos Martinez kick), 5:29
- Orlando – Marlon Moye-Moore 13-yard interception return (Carlos Martinez kick), 2:15

2nd quarter

- Orlando – Robert Quiroga 46-yard pass from Nick Hill (Carlos Martinez kick), 9:47
- Orlando – Bobby Sippio 30-yard pass from Nick Hill (Carlos Martinez kick), 5:41

3rd quarter

- Oklahoma City – Chad Cook 3-yard run (Michael Salerno kick), 7:45
- Orlando – Robert Quiroga 2-yard pass from Nick Hill (Carlos Martinez kick), 2:07
- Oklahoma City – Craig Fulton Jr. 35-yard pass from Xavier Lee (Michael Salerno kick), 0:00

4th quarter

- Orlando – Robert Quiroga 11-yard pass from Nick Hill (Carlos Martinez kick), 14:53

Passing

- Oklahoma City – Xavier Lee: 8/16, 155 yards, 1 TD
- Orlando – Nick Hill: 15/21, 217 yards, 6 TD

Rushing

- Oklahoma City – Chad Cook: 4 att, 23 yards, 1 TD
- Orlando – Nick Hill: 5 att, 25 yards

Receiving

- Oklahoma City – Jerel Myers: 8 rec, 115 yards
- Orlando – Robert Quiroga: 8 rec, 115 yards, 4 TD

=== Week 18: vs. Tulsa Talons ===
Quarter	1	2	3	4	Total
Talons	13	28	14	19	74
Yard Dawgz	12	21	7	21	61

at Cox Convention Center, Oklahoma City, Oklahoma

- Date: July 30
- Game time: 8:05 pm EDT
- Game attendance: 7,702
- Referee: Chris Snead
- Recap
