= 2010 Tulsa Talons season =

Arena Football League team season

- Head coach: Mitch Allner
- Home stadium: BOK Center

Results
- Record: 10–6
- Division place: 1st AC Southwest
- Playoffs: Lost Conference semifinals (Storm) 38–68
- Team DPY: Gabe Nyenhuis

The 2010 Tulsa Talons season was the 10th season for the franchise, and the first in the Arena Football League, coming from the AF2, which dissolved following the 2009 season. The team was coached by Mitch Allner and played their home games at BOK Center. Finishing first in the Southwest Division, the Talons were the only team from their division to make the playoffs, but lost 38–68 at home to the Tampa Bay Storm in the conference semifinals.

== Standings ==
Southwest Division
Team	W	L	PCT	PF	PA	DIV	CON	Home	Away
y-Tulsa Talons	10	6	.625	994	899	6–0	9–2	6–2	4–4
Oklahoma City Yard Dawgz	6	10	.375	833	870	3–3	4–6	5–3	1–7
Dallas Vigilantes	3	13	.187	800	920	2–4	2–9	1–7	2–6
Bossier–Shreveport Battle Wings	3	13	.187	799	1030	1–5	3–9	2–6	1–7

y - Clinched division

== Regular season schedule ==
The Talons opened their season at home against the Storm on April 3. The conclusion of their regular season was on the road against the Yard Dawgz.

Week	Day	Date	Kickoff	Opponent	Results		Location	Report
Week	Day	Date	Kickoff	Opponent	Score	Record	Location	Report
1	Saturday	April 3	8:00 pm	Tampa Bay Storm	W 69–58	1–0	BOK Center	^{[usurped]}
2	Saturday	April 10	8:00 pm	Dallas Vigilantes	W 63–59	2–0	BOK Center	^{[usurped]}
3	Bye							
4	Friday	April 23	10:30 pm	at Arizona Rattlers	L 76–77	2–1	US Airways Center	^{[usurped]}
5	Saturday	May 1	7:05 pm	at Jacksonville Sharks	L 62–60	2–2	Jacksonville Veterans Memorial Arena	
6	Saturday	May 8	8:00 pm	Alabama Vipers	W 62–56	3–2	BOK Center	
7	Saturday	May 15	7:00 pm	at Cleveland Gladiators	L 55–68	3–3	Quicken Loans Arena	
8	Saturday	May 22	8:00 pm	Oklahoma City Yard Dawgz	W 67–41	4–3	BOK Center	
9	Saturday	May 29	8:05 pm	at Bossier–Shreveport Battle Wings	W 52–48	5–3	CenturyTel Center	
10	Saturday	June 5	8:00 pm	Orlando Predators	L 54–57	5–4	BOK Center	
11	Friday	June 11	8:00 pm	at Dallas Vigilantes	W 69–51	6–4	American Airlines Center	^{[usurped]}
12	Friday	June 18	10:00 pm	at Spokane Shock	L 43–62	6–5	Spokane Veterans Memorial Arena	^{[usurped]}
13	Saturday	June 26	8:00 pm	Cleveland Gladiators	W 65–44	7–5	BOK Center	
14	Bye							
15	Saturday	July 10	8:00 pm	Bossier–Shreveport Battle Wings	W 74–45	8–5	BOK Center	
16	Saturday	July 17	8:30 pm	at Alabama Vipers	W 61–48	9–5	Von Braun Center	
17	Saturday	July 24	8:00 pm	Arizona Rattlers	L 51–61	9–6	BOK Center	
18	Friday	July 30	8:05 pm	at Oklahoma City Yard Dawgz	W 74–61	10–6	Cox Convention Center	

All times are EDT

== Playoff schedule ==
Round	Day	Date	Kickoff	Opponent	Score	Location	Report
AC Semifinals	Saturday	August 7	8:00 pm	Tampa Bay Storm	L 38–68	BOK Center	

All times are EDT

== Roster ==
2010 Tulsa Talons roster
Quarterbacks: 16 Justin Allgood; 6 Mike Potts; Fullbacks: 34 Odie Armstrong; Wide receivers: 5 Carlese Franklin; 3 Jeff Hughley; 2 Donovan Morgan; 8 LaRico Stevenson; 17 Collin Taylor	Offensive linemen: 92 Jordan Bedore; 99 Anthony Bolden; 94 Antwan Floyd; 90 Brett Rayl; -- Albert Stinson; Defensive linemen: 98 Callahan Bright; 23 Terrance Carter; 93 Adam Huebner; 97 Gabe Nyenhuis	Linebackers: 44 Jamar Ransom; 56 Steve Watson; Defensive backs: 4 Ronnie Amadi; 27 Terrell Mingo; 1 Christopher Royal; Kickers: 20 Marco Capozzoli	Injury reserve: 17 Tony Dodson K (IR); 70 Roderick Green OL (IR); 7 T. J. McKay DB (IR); 7 James Sadler DB (IR); Refused to report: -- Stephen Franklin (DNR); -- Peter Martinez K (DNR); -- Rico Reese DL (DNR); Other league exempt: currently vacant; Suspension: 98 John Scott (Susp.); rookies in italics Roster updated July 29, 2010; 23 Active, 8 Inactive → More rosters

== Regular season ==
=== Week 1: vs. Tampa Bay Storm ===
Quarter	1	2	3	4	Total
Storm	14	16	7	21	58
Talons	14	21	14	20	69

at BOK Center, Tulsa, Oklahoma

- Date: April 3
- Game time: 8:00 pm EDT
- Game attendance: 6,688
- Recap^{[usurped]}

Game information

1st quarter

- Tulsa – Carlese Franklin 17-yard pass from Justin Allgood (Tony Dodson kick), 10:54
- Tampa Bay – Hank Edwards Edwards 17-yard pass from Brett Dietz (Garrett Rivas kick), 8:33
- Tulsa – Jeff Hughley 1-yard run (Tony Dodson kick), 4:32
- Tampa Bay – Tyrone Timmons 42-yard pass from Brett Dietz (Garrett Rivas kick), 3:00

2nd quarter

- Tulsa – Jamar Watson 2-yard pass from Justin Allgood (Tony Dodson kick), 11:00
- Tampa Bay – Hank Edwards Edwards 7-yard pass from Brett Dietz (Garrett Rivas kick no good), 6:49
- Tulsa – Jeff Hughley 32-yard pass from Justin Allgood (Tony Dodson kick), 4:49
- Tampa Bay – Tyrone Timmons 5-yard pass from Brett Dietz (Garrett Rivas kick), 0:54
- Tulsa – Jamar Watson 3-yard run (Tony Dodson kick) 0:30
- Tampa Bay – Garrett Rivas 37-yard field goal, 0:00

3rd quarter

- Tulsa – Carlese Franklin 4-yard pass from Justin Allgood (Tony Dodson kick), 10:53
- Tampa Bay – Tyrone Timmons 24-yard pass from Brett Dietz (Garrett Rivas kick), 9:27
- Tulsa – Donovan Morgan 10-yard pass from Justin Allgood (Tony Dodson kick), 5:37

4th quarter

- Tulsa – Donovan Morgan 4-yard pass from Justin Allgood (Tony Dodson kick), 12:44
- Tampa Bay – Tyrone Timmons 11-yard pass from Brett Dietz (Garrett Rivas kick), 9:43
- Tampa Bay – Hank Edwards Edwards 23-yard pass from Brett Dietz (Garrett Rivas kick), 5:46
- Tulsa – Donovan Morgan 11-yard pass from Justin Allgood (Tony Dodson kick), 3:52
- Tulsa – Donovan Morgan 9-yard pass from Justin Allgood (Antwan Floyd pass no good), 1:00
- Tampa Bay – Tyrone Timmons 25-yard pass from Brett Dietz (Garrett Rivas kick), 0:30

Passing

- Tampa Bay – Brett Dietz: 25/44, 346 yards, 8 TD, 1 INT
- Tulsa – Justin Allgood: 26/36, 274 yards, 8 TD

Rushing

- Tampa Bay – Brett Dietz: 1 att, 4 yards
- Tulsa – Carlese Franklin: 3 att, 18 yards

Receiving

- Tampa Bay – Tyrone Timmons: 11 rec, 181 yards, 5 TD
- Tulsa – Donovan Morgan: 9 rec, 120 yards, 4 TD

Neither team had consecutive scores until early in the 4th quarter when the Talons scored a touchdown early in the 4th quarter to give them a 56–37 lead. The Storm however came back with consecutive scores of their own to make it a five-point game. When the Talons scored a pair of touchdowns late in the 4th quarter, it was enough to seal the win in their first game of the year. Quarterback Justin Allgood and receiver Donovan Morgan accounted for the majority of Tulsa's offense. Allgood threw for 274 yards and 8 touchdowns, while Morgan had 120 yards receiving and caught 4 touchdowns.

=== Week 2: vs. Dallas Vigilantes ===
Quarter	1	2	3	4	Total
Vigilantes	14	17	14	14	59
Talons	7	14	20	22	63

at BOK Center, Tulsa, Oklahoma

- Date: April 10
- Game time: 8:00 pm EDT
- Game attendance: 6,108
- Referee: Joe Pester
- Recap^{[usurped]}

Game information

1st quarter

- Dallas – Josh White 1-yard run (Mark Lewis kick), 5:30
- Tulsa – Jamar Watson 2-yard pass from Justin Allgood (Tony Dodson kick), 2:41
- Dallas – Kenny Henderson 6-yard pass from Shane Stafford (Mark Lewis kick), 0:00

2nd quarter

- Dallas – Josh White 1-yard run (Mark Lewis kick), 9:34
- Tulsa – Jeff Hughley 2-yard run (Tony Dodson kick), 7:00
- Dallas – Larry Brackins 2-yard pass from Shane Stafford (Mark Lewis kick), 1:18
- Tulsa – Donovan Morgan 45-yard pass from Justin Allgood (Tony Dodson kick), 0:54
- Dallas – Mark Lewis 11-yard field goal, 0:00

3rd quarter

- Dallas – Kenny Henderson 3-yard pass from Shane Stafford (Mark Lewis kick), 11:40
- Tulsa – Donovan Morgan 32-yard pass from Justin Allgood (Tony Dodson kick), 9:51
- Dallas – Kenny Henderson 22-yard pass from Shane Stafford (Mark Lewis kick), 8:42
- Dallas – Donovan Morgan 23-yard pass from Justin Allgood (Tony Dodson kick no good), 6:09
- Tulsa – John Scott 19-yard fumble return (Tony Dodson kick), 1:52

4th quarter

- Dallas – Josh White 3-yard run (Mark Lewis kick), 11:23
- Tulsa – Jeff Hughley 10-yard pass from Justin Allgood (Tony Dodson kick), 10:17
- Dallas – Derek Lee 20-yard pass from Shane Stafford (Mark Lewis kick), 6:33
- Tulsa – Justin Allgood 2-yard run (Donovan Morgan pass), 2:35
- Tulsa – Justin Allgood 1-yard run (Tony Dodson kick), 0:22

Passing

- Dallas – Shane Stafford: 31/47, 374 yards, 5 TD
- Tulsa – Justin Allgood: 10/23, 182 yards, 5 TD, 1 INT

Rushing

- Dallas – Josh White: 9 att, 33 yards, 3 TD
- Tulsa – Justin Allgood: 3 att, 3 yards, 2 TD

Receiving

- Dallas – Derek Lee: 12 rec, 151 yards, 1 TD
- Tulsa – Donovan Morgan: 4 rec, 112 yards, 3 TD

The Talons did not lead in the entire game until scoring the final points of the game. Down 59–48, quarterback Justin Allgood led the Talons to the end zone on their final two drives of the game, with both touchdowns scored by Allgood on short carries. The game winning score was set up by a forced fumble on Dallas quarterback Shane Stafford that was recovered by Jamar Ransom of the Talons at the Dallas 2-yard line. Allgood finished with only 10 completed passes in the entire game out of 23 attempts, but 5 of those completions were for touchdowns. In total, he threw for 182 yards. Donovan Morgan had 4 receptions for 112 yards and 3 touchdowns in the win.

=== Week 4: at Arizona Rattlers ===
Quarter	1	2	3	4	Total
Talons	14	20	14	28	76
Rattlers	17	19	14	27	77

at US Airways Center, Phoenix, Arizona

- Date: April 23
- Game time: 10:30 pm EDT
- Game attendance: 10,083
- Referee: Shawn Hochuli
- Recap^{[usurped]}

Game information

1st quarter

- Tulsa – Jeff Hughley 13-yard pass from Justin Allgood (Tony Dodson kick), 12:38
- Arizona – Anthony Mix 27-yard pass from Nick Davilla (Jason Witczak kick), 10:46
- Arizona – Jason Witczak 40-yard field goal
- Tulsa – Donovan Morgan 28-yard pass from Justin Allgood (Tony Dodson kick), 2:05
- Arizona – Rod Windsor 1-yard run (Jason Witczak kick), 0:00

2nd quarter

- Tulsa – Odie Armstrong 13-yard run (Tony Dodson kick), 14:32
- Arizona – Rod Windsor 22-yard pass from Nick Davilla (Jason Witczak kick), 11:02
- Tulsa – Jeff Hughley 20-yard fumble recovery (Tony Dodson kick no good), 8:28
- Arizona – Rod Windsor 24-yard pass from Nick Davilla (Jason Witczak kick), 3:57
- Tulsa – Donovan Morgan 12-yard pass from Justin Allgood (Tony Dodson kick), 0:45
- Arizona – Rod Windsor 6-yard run (Nick Davilla pass no good)

3rd quarter

- Tulsa – Donovan Morgan 24-yard pass from Justin Allgood (Tony Dodson kick), 13:17
- Arizona – Nick Davilla 1-yard run (Jason Witczak kick), 9:00
- Tulsa – Donovan Morgan 9-yard pass from Justin Allgood (Tony Dodson kick), 3:08
- Arizona – Rod Windsor 38-yard pass from Nick Davilla (Jason Witczak kick), 0:48

4th quarter

- Tulsa – Carlese Franklin 14-yard pass from Justin Allgood (Tony Dodson kick), 14:14
- Arizona – Rod Windsor 33-yard pass from Nick Davilla (Jason Witczak kick no good), 12:58
- Tulsa – Donovan Morgan 18-yard pass from Justin Allgood (Tony Dodson kick), 8:52
- Arizona – J.J. McKelvey 15-yard pass from Nick Davilla (Billy Farris run), 5:12
- Tulsa – Jeff Hughley 5-yard pass from Justin Allgood (Justin Allgood pass), 2:47
- Arizona – Rod Windsor 12-yard pass from Nick Davilla (Jason Witczak kick), 0:32
- Tulsa – Carlese Franklin 29-yard pass from Justin Allgood (Justin Allgood pass no good), 0:19
- Arizona – Rod Windsor 27-yard pass from Nick Davilla (Nick Davilla kick no good), 0:00

Passing

- Tulsa – Justin Allgood: 29/40, 350 yards, 10 TD, 1 INT
- Arizona – Nick Davila: 30/42, 413 yards, 8 TD, 1 INT

Rushing

- Tulsa – Odie Armstrong: 2 att, 9 yards, 1 TD
- Arizona – Rod Windsor: 2 att, 7 yards, 2 TD

Receiving

- Tulsa – Donovan Morgan: 9 rec, 128 yards, 5 TD
- Arizona – Rod Windsor: 16 rec, 230 yards, 6 TD

The Talons led the game 76–71 with no time remaining, but on an untimed down, Rod Windsor of the Rattlers was able to slip by the Tulsa defense one last time to score the game's winning touchdown. The Talons' Jeff Hughley recovered Tulsa's one fumble of the game and actually scored a touchdown on the play. Justin Allgood threw 10 touchdown passes, half of which went to Donovan Morgan.

=== Week 5: at Jacksonville Sharks ===
Quarter	1	2	3	4	Total
Talons	7	19	14	20	60
Sharks	14	14	7	27	62

at Jacksonville Veterans Memorial Arena, Jacksonville, Florida

- Date: May 1
- Game time: 7:05 pm EDT
- Recap

Game information

1st quarter

- Jacksonville – Jomo Wilson 32-yard pass from Aaron Garcia (Patrick Bugg kick), 14:15
- Tulsa – Donovan Morgan 12-yard pass from Justin Allgood (Tony Dodson kick), 8:43
- Jacksonville – Dallas Baker 4-yard pass from Aaron Garcia (Patrick Bugg kick), 1:47

2nd quarter

- Tulsa – Donovan Morgan 9-yard pass from Justin Allgood (Tony Dodson kick), 12:30
- Jacksonville – Sale' Key 3-yard pass from Aaron Garcia (Patrick Bugg kick), 9:48
- Tulsa – Jeff Hughley 21v pass from Justin Allgood (Tony Dodson kick), 6:32
- Jacksonville – Dallas Baker 15-yard pass from Aaron Garcia (Patrick Bugg kick), 3:50
- Tulsa – Jeff Hughley 4-yard pass from Justin Allgood (Tony Dodson kick no good), 0:01

3rd quarter

- Tulsa – Jeff Hughley 10-yard pass from Justin Allgood (Tony Dodson kick), 12:49
- Jacksonville – Sale' Key 26-yard pass from Aaron Garcia (Patrick Bugg kick), 7:39
- Tulsa – Odie Armstrong 1-yard run (Tony Dodson kick), 4:52

4th quarter

- Jacksonville – Justin Parrish 29-yard fumble return (Patrick Bugg kick), 13:59
- Tulsa – Donovan Morgan 9-yard pass from Justin Allgood (Tony Dodson kick), 10:42
- Jacksonville – Dallas Baker 25-yard pass from Aaron Garcia (Patrick Bugg kick no good) 6:30
- Tulsa – Jeff Hughley 50-yard kickoff return (Jeff Hughley pass no good), 7:22
- Jacksonville – Jomo Wilson 3-yard run (Bernard Morris run), 0:56
- Tulsa – Jeff Hughley 4-yard pass from Justin Allgood (Tony Dodson kick), 0:08
- Jacksonville – Dallas Baker 9-yard pass from Aaron Garcia (Bernard Morris run no good), 0:00

Passing

- Tulsa – Justin Allgood: 23/36, 253 yards, 7 TD
- Jacksonville – Aaron Garcia: 24/33, 294 yards, 7 TD, 2 INT

Rushing

- Tulsa – Odie Armstrong: 6 att, 14 yards, 1 TD
- Jacksonville – Jomo Wilson: 2 att, 3 yards, 1 TD

Receiving

- Tulsa – Donovan Morgan: 9 rec, 131 yards, 3 TD
- Jacksonville – Dallas Baker: 8 rec, 105 yards, 4 TD

=== Week 6: vs. Alabama Vipers ===
Quarter	1	2	3	4	Total
Vipers	14	14	14	14	56
Talons	6	7	29	20	62

at BOK Center, Tulsa, Oklahoma

- Date: May 8
- Game time: 8:00 pm EDT
- Referee: Joe Pester
- Recap

Game information

1st quarter

- Alabama – Michael Johnson 40-yard pass from Kevin Eakin (Liam Coen kick), 12:04
- Alabama – Dan Alexander 1-yard run (Liam Coen kick), 10:28
- Tulsa – Odie Armstrong 1-yard run (Tony Dodson kick no good), 6:29

2nd quarter

- Alabama – C.J. Johnson 6-yard pass from Kevin Eakin (Liam Coen kick), 7:29
- Tulsa – Jeff Hughley 4-yard pass from Justin Allgood (Tony Dodson kick), 4:42
- Alabama – Larry Shipp 7-yard pass from Kevin Eakin (Liam Coen kick), 0:25

3rd quarter

- Tulsa – Carlese Franklin 7-yard pass from Justin Allgood (Jamar Ransom pass), 11:29
- Alabama – Dan Alexander 1-yard run (Liam Coen kick), 9:35
- Tulsa – Donovan Morgan 8-yard pass from Justin Allgood (Tony Dodson kick no good), 8:33
- Tulsa – Odie Armstrong 7-yard pass from Justin Allgood (Donovan Morgan pass), 4:01
- Alabama – Dan Alexander 1-yard run (Liam Coen kick), 0:56
- Tulsa – Donovan Morgan 24-yard pass from Justin Allgood (Tony Dodson kick), 0:00

4th quarter

- Tulsa – Safety, 14:12
- Tulsa – Odie Armstrong 37-yard run (Tony Dodson kick blocked), 12:18
- Tulsa – Donovan Morgan 4-yard pass from Justin Allgood (Tony Dodson kick no good), 5:18
- Alabama – Larry Shipp 22-yard pass from Tony Colston (Liam Coen kick), 0:58
- Tulsa – Donovan Morgan 7-yard pass from Justin Allgood (Tony Dodson kick no good), 0:40
- Alabama – Tony Colston 10-yard run (Liam Coen kick), 0:28

Passing

- Alabama – Kevin Eakin: 23/32, 281 yards, 3 TD
- Tulsa – Justin Allgood: 23/31, 244 yards, 7 TD, 1 INT

Rushing

- Alabama – Dan Alexander: 11 att, 8 yards, 3 TD
- Tulsa – Odie Armstrong: 4 att, 41 yards, 2 TD

Receiving

- Alabama – Michael Johnson: 8 rec, 120 yards, 1 TD
- Tulsa – Carlese Franklin: 10 rec, 110 yards, 1 TD

The Talons extended their home winning streak to 13 games by defeating the Vipers 62–56, overcoming a 15-point deficit at halftime. Tied at 42–42 at the start of the 4th quarter, Tulsa had their first lead of the game when Jamar Ransom sacked Viper quarterback Kevin Eakin in the end zone for a safety. After the Talons received the free kick, Odie Armstrong ran 37 yards for a touchdown. Though the extra point was blocked the Talons now had a 50–42 advantage. Tulsa's defense stopped the Viper offense on the next drive, causing Alabama to turn the ball over on downs. With possession again, the Talons drove up the field for another touchdown, scored by Donovan Morgan on a 4-yard pass from Justin Allgood. The Vipers made it a 6-point game with 28 seconds left after a touchdown run, but their ensuing onside kick was recovered by Tulsa, who ran out the clock to preserve the win.

Allgood completed 23 of 31 passes for 244 yards and 7 touchdowns. Morgan had the most touchdown catches on the team with 4, but Carlese Franklin led in receiving yards with 110.

=== Week 7: at Cleveland Gladiators ===
Quarter	1	2	3	4	Total
Talons	20	13	14	8	55
Gladiators	21	20	14	13	68

at Quicken Loans Arena, Cleveland, Ohio

- Date: May 15
- Game time: 7:00 pm EDT
- Game attendance: 8,979
- Referee: Ron Torbert
- Recap

Game information

1st quarter

- Cleveland – Ben Nelson 11-yard pass from John Dutton (Matt Denny kick), 10:22
- Tulsa – Jeff Hughley 15-yard pass from Justin Allgood (Tony Dodson kick no good), 9:15
- Cleveland – Chris Johnson 9-yard pass from John Dutton (Matt Denny kick), 6:15
- Tulsa – Jeff Hughley 29-yard pass from Justin Allgood (Tony Dodson kick), 3:56
- Cleveland – Ben Nelson 45-yard pass from John Dutton (Matt Denny kick), 2:40
- Tulsa – Donovan Morgan 33-yard pass from Justin Allgood (Tony Dodson kick), 1:25

2nd quarter

- Cleveland – Ben Nelson 26-yard pass from John Dutton (Matt Denny kick no good), 14:15
- Tulsa – Carlese Franklin 13-yard pass from Justin Allgood (Tony Dodson kick), 12:19
- Cleveland – Ben Nelson 9-yard pass from John Dutton (Matt Denny kick), 8:44
- Cleveland – Ben Nelson 4-yard pass from John Dutton (Matt Denny kick), 1:00
- Tulsa – Jeff Hughley 5-yard pass from Justin Allgood (Tony Dodson kick no good), 0:11

3rd quarter

- Tulsa – Adam Huebner 9-yard fumble return (Tony Dodson kick), 11:26
- Cleveland – TJ Watkins 1-yard run (Matt Denny kick), 5:21
- Tulsa – Donovan Morgan 16-yard pass from Justin Allgood (Tony Dodson kick), 1:34
- Cleveland – Chris Johnson 46-yard pass from John Dutton (Matt Denny kick), 0:18

4th quarter

- Tulsa – Carlese Franklin 11-yard pass from Justin Allgood (Donovan Morgan pass), 12:04
- Cleveland – Chris Johnson 4-yard pass from John Dutton (Matt Denny kick), 9:19
- Cleveland – Ben Nelson 28-yard pass from John Dutton (Matt Denny kick no good), 3:48

Passing

- Tulsa – Justin Allgood: 24/37, 352 yards, 7 TD, 2 INT
- Cleveland – John Dutton: 28/48, 397 yards, 9 TD

Rushing

- Tulsa – Odie Armstrong: 3 att, 17 yards
- Cleveland – Russell Monk: 4 att, 11 yards

Receiving

- Tulsa – Donovan Morgan: 11 rec, 188 yards, 2 TD
- Cleveland – Ben Nelson: 13 rec, 202 yards, 6 TD

=== Week 8: vs. Oklahoma City Yard Dawgz ===
Quarter	1	2	3	4	Total
Yard Dawgz	7	14	0	20	41
Talons	14	19	13	21	67

at BOK Center, Tulsa, Oklahoma

- Date: May 22
- Game time: 8:00 pm EDT
- Game attendance: 7,235
- Recap

Game information

1st quarter

- Tulsa – Carlese Franklin 6-yard run (Tony Dodson kick), 12:47
- Tulsa – Jeff Hughley 5-yard pass from Justin Allgood (Tony Dodson kick), 8:11
- Oklahoma City – Anthony Hines 27-yard pass from Tommy Grady (A.J. Haglund kick), 1:25

2nd quarter

- Tulsa – Carlese Franklin 14-yard pass from Justin Allgood (Tony Dodson pass interception), 5:17
- Oklahoma City – Chad Cook 3-yard run (AJ Haglund kick), 3:23
- Tulsa – Carlese Franklin 14-yard pass from Justin Allgood (Jeff Hughley run no good), 1:52
- Oklahoma City – Al Hunt 9-yard pass from Tommy Grady (A.J. Haglund kick), 0:20
- Tulsa – Donovan Morgan 34-yard pass from Justin Allgood (Tony Dodson kick), 0:07

3rd quarter

- Tulsa – Jeff Hughley 5-yard pass from Justin Allgood (Tony Dodson run no good), 8:20
- Tulsa – Carlese Franklin 3-yard run (Tony Dodson kick), 2:41

4th quarter

- Tulsa – Carlese Franklin 15-yard pass from Justin Allgood (Tony Dodson kick), 14:13
- Oklahoma City – Xavier Lee 1-yard run (Xavier Lee run no good), 5:12
- Tulsa – Michael Potts 1-yard run (Tony Dodson kick), 2:41
- Oklahoma City – Howard Duncan 3-yard pass from Xavier Lee (Al Hunt pass), 0:54
- Tulsa – LaRico Stevenson 9-yard kickoff return (Tony Dodson kick), 0:52
- Oklahoma City – Anthony Hines 3-yard pass from Xavier Lee (Al Hunt pass no good), 0:10
- Oklahoma City – Tommy Grady: 15/28, 171 yards, 2 TD, 1 INT
- Tulsa – Justin Allgood: 15/19, 178 yards, 6 TD

Rushing

- Oklahoma City – Xavier Lee: 3 att, 31 yards, 1 TD
- Tulsa – Odie Armstrong: 4 att, 38 yards

Receiving

- Oklahoma City – Anthony Hines: 7 rec, 93 yards, 2 TD
- Tulsa – Carlese Franklin: 5 rec, 62 yards, 3 TD

=== Week 9: at Bossier–Shreveport Battle Wings ===
Quarter	1	2	3	4	Total
Talons	7	19	19	7	52
Battle Wings	7	19	14	8	48

at CenturyTel Center, Bossier City, Louisiana

- Date: May 29
- Game time: 8:05 pm EDT
- Game attendance: 3,173
- Referee: Scott Vaughn
- Recap

Game information

1st quarter

- Bossier–Shreveport – James Jordan 6-yard pass from Kinsmon Lancaster (Nick Gatto kick), 7:02
- Tulsa – Odie Armstrong 17-yard run (Tony Dodson kick), 3:14

2nd quarter

- Tulsa – Donovan Morgan 16-yard pass from Justin Allgood (Tony Dodson kick no good), 13:52
- Bossier–Shreveport – Willis Marshall 36-yard pass from Gary Cooper (Nick Gatto kick no good), 11:13
- Tulsa – Jeff Hughley 19-yard pass from Justin Allgood (Tony Dodson kick no good), 9:35
- Bossier–Shreveport – P.J. Berry 20-yard pass from Gary Cooper (Nick Gatto kick), 7:23
- Tulsa – Carlese Franklin 45-yard pass from Justin Allgood (Tony Dodson kick), 5:12
- Bossier–Shreveport – Randy Hymes 43-yard pass from Gary Cooper (Nick Gatto kick no good), 0:15

3rd quarter

- Tulsa – Donovan Morgan 5-yard pass from Justin Allgood no good), 12:35
- Bossier–Shreveport – James Jordan 14-yard pass from Gary Cooper (Nick Gatto kick), 9:43
- Tulsa – Donovan Morgan 19-yard pass from Justin Allgood (Carlese Franklin pass no good), 7:57
- Bossier–Shreveport – James Jordan 9-yard pass from Gary Cooper (Nick Gatto kick), 2:35
- Tulsa – Donovan Morgan 2-yard pass from Justin Allgood (Tony Dodson kick), 0:00

4th quarter

- Bossier–Shreveport – Willis Marshall 7-yard interception return (P.J. Berry pass), 10:52
- Tulsa – Jeff Hughley 40-yard pass from Justin Allgood (Tony Dodson kick), 9:24

Passing

- Tulsa – Justin Allgood: 16/34, 285 yards, 7 TD, 1 INT
- Bossier–Shreveport – Gary Cooper: 19/35, 275 yards, 5 TD, 1 INT

Rushing

- Tulsa – Odie Armstrong: 4 att, 55 yards, 1 TD
- Bossier–Shreveport – Kinsmon Lancaster: 1 att, 16 yards

Receiving

- Tulsa – Donovan Morgan: 8 rec, 131 yards, 4 TD
- Bossier–Shreveport – James Jordan: 9 rec, 81 yards, 3 TD

=== Week 10: vs. Orlando Predators ===
Quarter	1	2	3	4	Total
Predators	14	13	7	23	57
Talons	14	7	14	19	54

at BOK Center, Tulsa, Oklahoma

- Date: June 5
- Game time: 8:00 pm EDT
- Recap

Game information

1st quarter

- Tulsa – Odie Armstrong 3-yard run (Tony Dodson kick)
- Orlando – Joshua Bush 50-yard kickoff return (Carlos Martinez kick)
- Tulsa – Jeff Hughley 2-yard run (Tony Dodson kick), 3:46
- Orlando – Bobby Sippio 32-yard pass from Nick Hill (Carlos Martinez kick), 0:00

2nd quarter

- Orlando – Nick Hill 1-yard run (Carlos Martinez kick), 7:31
- Tulsa – Donovan Morgan 36-yard pass from Justin Allgood (Tony Dodson kick)
- Orlando – Marlon Moye-Moore 1-yard run (Carlos Martinez kick no good)

3rd quarter

- Tulsa – Donovan Morgan 8-yard pass from Justin Allgood (Tony Dodson kick)
- Orlando – T.T. Toliver 8-yard pass from Nick Hill (Carlos Martinez kick)
- Tulsa – Jeff Hughley 0-yard kickoff return (Tony Dodson kick)

4th quarter

- Orlando – Derrick Lewis 9-yard pass from Nick Hill (Carlos Martinez kick no good)
- Orlando – Derrick Lewis 6-yard pass from Nick Hill (Carlos Martinez kick)
- Tulsa – Carlese Franklin 31-yard pass from Justin Allgood (Tony Dodson kick)
- Orlando – Joshua Bush 50-yard kickoff return (Carlos Martinez kick)
- Tulsa – Donovan Morgan 22-yard pass from Justin Allgood (Tony Dodson kick no good)
- Orlando – Carlos Martinez 12-yard field goal
- Tulsa – Jeff Hughley 13-yard pass from Justin Allgood (Tony Dodson kick no good)

Passing

- Orlando – Nick Hill: 27/41, 239 yards, 4 TD, 3 INT
- Tulsa – Justin Allgood: 23/43, 220 yards, 5 TD, 1 INT

Rushing

- Orlando – Marlon Moye-Moore: 1 att, 1 yard, 1 TD
- Tulsa – Justin Allgood: 1 att, 44 yards

Receiving

- Orlando – Joshua Bush: 10 rec, 81 yards
- Tulsa – Donovan Morgan: 9 rec, 108 yards, 3 TD

=== Week 11: at Dallas Vigilantes ===
Quarter	1	2	3	4	Total
Talons	7	21	13	28	69
Vigilantes	14	17	13	7	51

at American Airlines Center, Dallas, Texas

- Date: June 11
- Game time: 8:00 pm EDT
- Game attendance: 4,192
- Referee: Mark Windham
- Recap^{[usurped]}

Game information

1st quarter

- Dallas – Josh White 2-yard run (Mark Lewis kick), 6:51
- Tulsa – Carlese Franklin 8-yard pass from Justin Allgood (Marco Cabozzoli kick), 4:14
- Dallas – Kenny Henderson 18-yard pass from Collin Drafts (Mark Lewis kick), 2:35

2nd quarter

- Dallas – Matt Fields 29-yard pass from Collin Drafts (Mark Lewis kick), 9:03
- Tulsa – Odie Armstrong 2-yard run (Marco Cabozzoli kick), 6:46
- Dallas – Kenny Henderson 24-yard pass from Collin Drafts (Mark Lewis kick), 5:08
- Tulsa – Donovan Morgan 10-yard pass from Justin Allgood (Marco Cabozzoli kick), 0:52
- Dallas – Mark Lewis 20-yard field goal, 0:19
- Tulsa – Donovan Morgan 8-yard pass from Justin Allgood (Marco Cabozzoli kick), 0:14

3rd quarter

- Dallas – Josh White 1-yard run (Mark Lewis kick), 9:09
- Dallas – Larry Brackins 0-yard kickoff return (Mark Lewis kick no good), 8:07
- Tulsa – Jeff Hughley 39-yard pass from Justin Allgood (Carlese Franklin pass no good), 6:55
- Tulsa – Donovan Morgan 14-yard pass from Justin Allgood (Marco Cabozzoli kick), 5:14

4th quarter

- Tulsa – Jeff Hughley 1-yard run (Marco Cabozzoli kick), 12:03
- Dallas – Kenny Henderson 56-yard kickoff return (Mark Lewis kick), 11:16
- Tulsa – Carlese Franklin 7-yard pass from Justin Allgood (Marco Cabozzoli kick), 10:05
- Tulsa – Donovan Morgan 7-yard pass from Justin Allgood (Marco Cabozzoli kick), 3:14
- Tulsa – Donovan Morgan 7-yard pass from Justin Allgood (Marco Cabozzoli kick), 0:35

Passing

- Tulsa – Justin Allgood: 25/37, 384 yards, 8 TD, 1 INT
- Dallas – Collin Drafts: 23/37, 239 yards, 4 TD, 3 INT

Rushing

- Tulsa – Odie Armstrong: 3 att, 19 yards, 1 TD
- Dallas – Josh White: 6 att, 10 yards, 2 TD

Receiving

- Tulsa – Donovan Morgan: 11 rec, 143 yards, 5 TD
- Dallas – Kenny Henderson: 10 rec, 104 yards, 2 TD

=== Week 12: at Spokane Shock ===
Quarter	1	2	3	4	Total
Talons	7	14	14	7	42
Shock	14	21	14	14	63

at Spokane Veterans Memorial Arena, Spokane, Washington

- Date: June 18
- Game time: 10:00 pm EDT
- Game attendance: 10,077
- Referee: Shane Anderson
- Recap^{[usurped]}

Game information

1st quarter

- Spokane – Antwan Marsh 1-yard run (Taylor Rowan kick), 9:55
- Tulsa – Jeff Hughley 25-yard pass from Justin Allgood (Marco Cabozzoli kick), 6:09
- Spokane – Raul Vijil 9-yard pass from Kyle Rowley (Taylor Rowan kick), 1:23

2nd quarter

- Tulsa – Donovan Morgan 13-yard pass from Justin Allgood (Marco Cabozzoli kick), 12:55
- Spokane – Ed Ta'amu 7-yard pass from Kyle Rowley (Taylor Rowan kick), 9:33
- Tulsa – Carlese Franklin 16-yard pass from Justin Allgood (Marco Cabozzoli kick), 5:22
- Spokane – Raul Vijil 15-yard pass from Kyle Rowley (Taylor Rowan kick), 4:28
- Spokane – Kyle Rowley 2-yard run (Taylor Rowan kick), 0:35

3rd quarter

- Tulsa – Donovan Morgan 9-yard pass from Justin Allgood (Marco Cabozzoli kick), 12:36
- Spokane – Raul Vijil 8-yard pass from Kyle Rowley (Taylor Rowan kick), 7:53
- Tulsa – Odie Armstrong 2-yard run (Marco Cabozzoli kick), 4:36
- Spokane – Emery Sammons 47-yard pass from Kyle Rowley (Taylor Rowan kick), 0:00

4th quarter

- Spokane – Raul Vijil 5-yard pass from Kyle Rowley (Taylor Rowan kick), 5:44
- Tulsa – Donovan Morgan 1-yard pass from Justin Allgood (Marco Cabozzoli kick), 0:31
- Spokane – Raul Vijil 5-yard pass from Kyle Rowley (Taylor Rowan kick), 0:19

Passing

- Tulsa – Justin Allgood: 24/47, 341 yards, 5 TD, 2 INT
- Spokane – Kyle Rowley: 28/37, 307 yards, 7 TD, 1 INT

Rushing

- Tulsa – Odie Armstrong: 3 att, 10 yards, 1 TD
- Spokane – Clay Harrell: 2 att, 10 yards

Receiving

- Tulsa – Donovan Morgan: 9 rec, 129 yards, 3 TD
- Spokane – Raul Vijil: 11 rec, 103 yards, 5 TD

=== Week 13: vs. Cleveland Gladiators ===
Quarter	1	2	3	4	Total
Gladiators	14	10	6	14	44
Talons	13	22	7	23	65

at BOK Center, Tulsa, Oklahoma

- Date: June 26
- Game time: 8:00 pm EDT
- Recap

=== Week 15: vs. Bossier–Shreveport Battle Wings ===
Quarter	1	2	3	4	Total
Battle Wings	10	21	0	14	45
Talons	14	20	27	13	74

at BOK Center, Tulsa, Oklahoma

- Date: July 10
- Game time: 8:00 pm EDT
- Recap

Game information

1st quarter

- Bossier–Shreveport – Nick Gatto 35-yard field goal, 10:54
- Tulsa – Donovan Morgan 26-yard pass from Michael Potts (Marco Capozzoli kick), 9:48
- Bossier–Shreveport – P.J. Berry 7-yard pass from Jimmy Welker (Nick Gatto kick), 6:04
- Tulsa – Donovan Morgan 6-yard pass from Justin Allgood (Marco Capozzoli kick), 3:17

2nd quarter

- Tulsa – Carlese Franklin 22-yard pass from Justin Allgood (Marco Capozzoli kick no good), 12:22
- Bossier–Shreveport – Jason Schule 2-yard run (Nick Gatto kick), 8:36
- Tulsa – Donovan Morgan 24-yard pass from Justin Allgood (Marco Capozzoli kick), 5:22
- Bossier–Shreveport – Kinsmon Lancaster 35-yard pass from Jimmy Welker (Nick Gatto kick), 4:17
- Tulsa – Donovan Morgan 16-yard pass from Justin Allgood (Marco Capozzoli kick), 1:52
- Bossier–Shreveport – P.J. Berry 5-yard pass from Jimmy Welker (Nick Gatto kick), 0:00

3rd quarter

- Tulsa – Carlese Franklin 2-yard pass from Justin Allgood (Marco Capozzoli kick), 10:52
- Tulsa – Donovan Morgan 45-yard pass from Justin Allgood (Marco Capozzoli kick no good), 7:49
- Tulsa – Odie Armstrong 1-yard run (Marco Capozzoli kick), 3:50
- Tulsa – Adam Huebner 0-yard fumble return (Marco Capozzoli kick), 1:17

4th quarter

- Tulsa – Carlese Franklin 6-yard pass from Justin Allgood (Marco Capozzoli kick no good), 11:37
- Bossier–Shreveport – James Jordan 14-yard pass from Jimmy Welker (Nick Gatto kick), 8:00
- Tulsa – Jeff Hughley 21-yard pass from Michael Potts (Marco Capozzoli kick), 5:21
- Bossier–Shreveport – Kinsmon Lancaster 10-yard run (Nick Gatto kick), 1:00

Passing

- Bossier–Shreveport – Jimmy Welker: 24/44, 239 yards, 4 TD, 2 INT
- Tulsa – Justin Allgood: 15/25, 223 yards, 7 TD, 1 INT

Rushing

- Bossier–Shreveport – Kinsmon Lancaster: 1 att, 10 yards, 1 TD
- Tulsa – Odie Armstrong: 7 att, 27 yards, 1 TD

Receiving

- Bossier–Shreveport – P.J. Berry: 9 rec, 81 yards, 2 TD
- Tulsa – Donovan Morgan: 9 rec, 180 yards, 5 TD

=== Week 16: at Alabama Vipers ===
Quarter	1	2	3	4	Total
Talons	0	28	21	12	61
Vipers	14	14	7	13	48

at Von Braun Center, Huntsville, Alabama

- Date: July 17
- Game time: 8:30 pm EDT
- Game attendance: 4,298
- Recap

Game information

1st quarter

- Alabama – Michael Johnson 17-yard pass from Tim Hicks (Brian Jackson kick), 11:53
- Alabama – Vince Hill 46-yard interception return (Brian Jackson kick), 9:14

2nd quarter

- Alabama – Larry Shipp 14-yard pass from Tim Hicks (Brian Jackson kick), 12:48
- Tulsa – Donovan Morgan 6-yard pass from Justin Allgood (Greg Gundersen kick blocked), 10:48
- Tulsa – Odie Armstrong 1-yard run (Greg Gundersen kick), 5:18
- Tulsa – Jeff Hughley 27-yard pass from Justin Allgood (Jeff Hughley run), 0:49
- Alabama – Tim Hicks 5-yard run (Brian Jackson kick), 0:21
- Tulsa – Roderick Green 35-yard pass from Justin Allgood (Greg Gundersen kick), 0:10

3rd quarter

- Tulsa – Roderick Green 1-yard run (Greg Gundersen kick), 13:21
- Tulsa – Odie Armstrong 1-yard pass from Justin Allgood (Greg Gundersen kick), 7:58
- Tulsa – Roderick Green 32-yard pass from Justin Allgood (Greg Gundersen kick), 2:56
- Alabama – Willie Quinne 39-yard pass from Tony Colston (Brian Jackson kick), 0:00

4th quarter

- Tulsa – Greg Gundersen 12-yard field goal, 11:12
- Tulsa – Jeff Hughley 34-yard pass from Justin Allgood (Greg Gundersen kick blocked), 6:19
- Alabama – Michael Johnson 22-yard pass from Tony Colston (Brian Jackson kick)
- Tulsa – Greg Gundersen 14-yard field goal, 0:49
- Alabama – Larry Shipp 31-yard pass from Tony Colston (Lorenzo Breland pass no good), 0:42

Passing

- Tulsa – Justin Allgood: 25/40, 310 yards, 6 TD, 1 INT
- Alabama – Tony Colston: 12/19, 307 yards, 3 TD

Rushing

- Tulsa – Odie Armstrong: 8 att, 42 yards, 1 TD
- Alabama – Larry Shipp: 3 att, 18 yards

Receiving

- Tulsa – Roderick Green: 9 rec, 152 yards, 2 TD
- Alabama – Larry Shipp: 9 rec, 105 yards, 2 TD

With the win, the Talons clinched the Southwest Division.

=== Week 17: vs. Arizona Rattlers ===
Quarter	1	2	3	4	Total
Rattlers	13	13	14	21	61
Talons	13	17	14	7	51

at BOK Center, Tulsa, Oklahoma

- Date: July 24
- Game time: 8:00 pm EDT
- Recap

Game information

1st quarter

- Tulsa – Donovan Morgan 4-yard pass from Justin Allgood (Marco Capozzoli kick no good), 12:41
- Arizona – J.J. McKelvey 5-yard pass from Nick Davila (Fabrizio Scaccia run no good), 7:12
- Tulsa – Carlese Franklin 11-yard pass from Justin Allgood (Marco Capozzoli kick), 4:07
- Arizona – J.J. McKelvey 7-yard pass from Nick Davila (Fabrizio Scaccia kick), 0:54

2nd quarter

- Tulsa – Marco Capozzoli 22-yard field goal, 11:08
- Arizona – Trandon Harvey 39-yard pass from Nick Davila (Fabrizio Scaccia kick), 9:28
- Tulsa – Jeff Hughley 6-yard pass from Justin Allgood (Marco Capozzoli kick), 5:07
- Arizona – Johnie Kirton 1-yard run (Billy Farris run no good), 1:00
- Tulsa – Donovan Morgan 1-yard pass from Justin Allgood (Marco Capozzoli kick), 0:38

3rd quarter

- Tulsa – Justin Allgood 2-yard run (Marco Capozzoli kick), 10:41
- Arizona – Rod Windsor 40-yard pass from Nick Davila (Billy Farris run), 9:32
- Arizona – Kelvin Morris 50-yard fumble return (Fabrizio Scaccia kick no good), 6:47
- Tulsa – Carlese Franklin 14-yard pass from Justin Allgood (Marco Capozzoli kick), 1:44

4th quarter

- Arizona – J.J. McKelvey 8-yard pass from Nick Davila (Fabrizio Scaccia kick), 10:16
- Arizona – Rod Windsor 3-yard pass from Nick Davila (Fabrizio Scaccia kick), 6:09
- Tulsa – Jamar Ransom 1-yard run (Marco Capozzoli kick), 2:11
- Arizona – Rod Windsor 21-yard pass from Nick Davila (Fabrizio Scaccia kick), 0:49

Passing

- Arizona – Nick Davila: 25/36, 296 yards, 7 TD, 2 INT
- Tulsa – Justin Allgood: 20/36, 181 yards, 5 TD, 1 INT

Rushing

- Arizona – Johnie Kirton: 2 att, 0 yards, 1 TD
- Tulsa – Justin Allgood: 4 att, 40 yards, 1 TD

Receiving

- Arizona – J.J. McKelvey: 14 rec, 127 yards, 3 TD
- Tulsa – Carlese Franklin: 6 rec, 89 yards, 2 TD

=== Week 18: at Oklahoma City Yard Dawgz ===
Quarter	1	2	3	4	Total
Talons	13	28	14	19	74
Yard Dawgz	12	21	7	21	61

at Cox Convention Center, Oklahoma City, Oklahoma

- Date: July 30
- Game time: 8:05 pm EDT
- Game attendance: 7,702
- Referee: Chris Snead
- Recap

== Playoffs ==
=== American Conference semifinals: vs. Tampa Bay Storm ===
Quarter	1	2	3	4	Total
Storm	14	20	20	14	68
Talons	6	13	7	12	38

at BOK Center, Tulsa, Oklahoma

- Date: August 7
- Game time: 8:00 pm EDT
- Recap

Game information

1st quarter

- Tulsa – Donovan Morgan 17-yard pass from Justin Allgood (Marco Capozzoli kick no good), 13:01
- Tampa Bay – Eric Ortiz 3-yard run (Garrett Rivas kick), 9:32
- Tampa Bay – Tyrone Timmons 8-yard pass from Brett Dietz (Garrett Rivas kick), 2:23

2nd quarter

- Tampa Bay – Hank Edwards 38-yard pass from Brett Dietz (Garrett Rivas kick no good), 11:23
- Tulsa – Donovan Morgan 2-yard pass from Justin Allgood (Marco Capozzoli kick)
- Tampa Bay – Sedrick Robinson 30-yard pass from Brett Dietz (Garrett Rivas kick), 2:59
- Tulsa – Carlese Franklin 13-yard pass from Justin Allgood (Marco Capozzoli kick no good), 0:44
- Tampa Bay – Sedrick Robinson 11-yard pass from Brett Dietz (Garrett Rivas kick), 0:06

3rd quarter

- Tampa Bay – Tyrone Timmons 6-yard pass from Brett Dietz (Garrett Rivas kick no good), 9:41
- Tulsa – Donovan Morgan 10-yard pass from Justin Allgood (Marco Capozzoli kick), 5:55
- Tampa Bay – Tyrone Timmons 7-yard pass from Brett Dietz (Garrett Rivas kick), 4:47
- Tampa Bay – Eric Ortiz 2-yard run (Garrett Rivas kick), 2:01

4th quarter

- Tampa Bay – DeAndrew Rubin 38-yard pass from Brett Dietz (Garrett Rivas kick), 12:29
- Tulsa – Jeff Hughley 12-yard pass from Justin Allgood (Donovan Morgan pass no good), 7:01
- Tampa Bay – Eric Ortiz 50-yard kickoff return (Garrett Rivas kick), 6:12
- Tulsa – Donovan Morgan 6-yard pass from Justin Allgood (Jeff Hughley pass no good), 3:43

Passing

- Tampa Bay – Brett Dietz: 22/29, 263 yards, 7 TD
- Tulsa – Justin Allgood: 20/43, 242 yards, 6 TD, 3 INT

Rushing

- Tampa Bay – Eric Ortiz: 4 att, 9 yards, 2 TD
- Tulsa – Carlese Franklin: 1 att, 25 yards

Receiving

- Tampa Bay – Sedrick Robinson: 7 rec, 87 yards, 2 TD
- Tulsa – Carlese Franklin: 8 rec, 121 yards, 1 TD
