= Ronnie Amadi =

American football player (born 1981)

No. 40
- Position: Defensive back

Personal information
- Born: October 6, 1981 (age 45); Columbia, South Carolina, U.S.
- Listed height: 6 ft 0 in (1.83 m)
- Listed weight: 185 lb (84 kg)

Career information
- High school: Houston (TX) Alief Hastings
- College: Kansas
- NFL draft: 2006: undrafted

Career history
- Kansas City Brigade (2006–2007)*; Green Bay Blizzard (2007); New York Dragons (2008); Columbus Destroyers (2008)*; Calgary Stampeders (2009–2010); Tulsa Talons (2010)
- * Offseason or practice squad member only

Career CFL statistics
- Tackles: 28
- Pass deflections: 3
- Sacks: 1

Career AFL statistics
- Tackles: 51.5
- Pass breakups: 9
- Fumble recoveries: 2
- Stats at ArenaFan.com

Ronnie Amadi (born October 6, 1981) is an American former professional football defensive back. He played arena football in the Arena Football League (AFL) and af2 as well as Canadian football in the Canadian Football League (CFL). His most substantial professional experience came with the Calgary Stampeders of the CFL, where he started 11 games as a defensive halfback. He played college football at the University of Kansas. Amadi also played for the New York Dragons and the Tulsa Talons of the AFL.

== Early life ==
Amadi and his brother, Donnie Amadi, were born in Columbia, South Carolina. The brothers lived in Nigeria for six years with their father, John Amadi, before returning to the United States to live with their mother, Christiana Georgewill, in Houston, Texas. While in Nigeria, the Amadi brothers frequently played soccer, but they transitioned to American football upon moving to Texas.

== Early career ==
Amadi played high school football at Alief Hastings High School. He recorded 80 tackles and three interceptions in 1999 before being named an all-district player as a senior in the 2000 season. Amadi was also a member of Alief Hastings' track and field team. Following his senior season, Amadi was recruited by several programs, including Texas Tech and Indiana. He committed to play for the Kansas Jayhawks in early 2001, largely because Kansas also recruited his brother, with whom he played in high school.

As a freshman, Amadi was designated a redshirt and did not play. As a backup cornerback in 2002, Amadi received substantial playing time due to personnel changes resulting in him being the sole backup to both starting cornerbacks. He continued in a reserve role through 2004. After backing up cornerback Theo Baines as a junior, Amadi started much of his senior season in place of Baines due to nagging injuries. In a November game against the Nebraska Cornhuskers, Amadi blocked a punt which was returned for a touchdown by teammate Darren Rus, marking the second time the two had combined to return a blocked punt for a touchdown. By early November, Amadi had recorded 22 tackles and two fumble recoveries in his final and most successful college season. Amadi also played on the college indoor track and field team while at Kansas when not involved in football activities.

== Professional career ==
Amadi was eligible for the 2006 NFL draft but went undrafted. For the following three years, Amadi played arena football for several professional league teams and one developmental league team. He signed with the Kansas City Brigade of the Arena Football League (AFL) in December 2006, but the Brigade released him in February 2007 before the start of the regular season. Amadi played for the Green Bay Blizzard of af2 in 2007 before returning to the AFL with the New York Dragons the following year. He recorded 20 solo tackles, nine tackle assists, two pass breakups and one fumble recovery for the Dragons. Amadi was picked up by the Columbus Destroyers in August 2008 after the Dragons released him.

In 2009, Amadi signed with the Calgary Stampeders and joined the team in the middle of training camp. Amadi was initially considered unlikely to play a large role, but he was forced into a starting role after two knee injuries to starting defensive halfbacks Brandon Smith and J. R. Ruffin. Amadi struggled in his first starts for the Stampeders, but he improved as the season continued. He started in 11 consecutive games before being moved to the practice squad, where he remained for the rest of the season. Before being moved off the active roster, Amadi recorded 28 tackles, three pass deflections, and a sack. He later re-signed with the Stampeders but was released after suffering a strained quadriceps in the preseason. Amadi played for the Tulsa Talons of the AFL in 2010, recording 24 solo tackles, six tackle assists, seven pass breakups and one fumble recovery.

=== AFL statistics ===
Year	Team	Defensive										Returns		
Year	Team	Tkl	Ast	Sck	PB	FF	FR	Blk	Int	Yds	TD	Ret	Yds	TD
2008	New York	20	9	0.0	2	0	1	0	0	0	0	1	3	0
2010	Tulsa	24	6	0.0	7	0	1	0	0	0	0	0	0	0
Career		44	15	0.0	9	0	2	0	0	0	0	1	3	0

== Personal life ==
Away from football, Amadi has also spent time as a model.
