= Randy Hymes =

American football player (born 1979)

No. 80, 81
- Position: Wide receiver

Personal information
- Born: August 7, 1979 (age 47); Galveston, Texas, U.S.
- Listed height: 6 ft 3 in (1.91 m)
- Listed weight: 211 lb (96 kg)

Career information
- High school: Hitchcock (Hitchcock, Texas)
- College: Grambling State
- NFL draft: 2002: undrafted

Career history
- Baltimore Ravens (2002–2005); Jacksonville Jaguars (2006)*; Minnesota Vikings (2007)*; Cleveland Gladiators (2008); Abilene Ruff Riders (2009); Bossier-Shreveport Battle Wings (2010); Spokane Shock (2011); Pittsburgh Power (2012)
- * Offseason or practice squad member only

Awards and highlights
- 2000-2001 HBCU National Champion; Offensive National Player of The Year (2001); SWAC Player of The Year (2001); Eddie Robinson Player of The Year (2001); Bayou Classic MVP (2001); Bayou Classic MVP Elite Club (2016); Grambling Legends Sports Hall of Fame (2025)

Career NFL statistics
- Receptions: 43
- Receiving yards: 578
- Receiving touchdowns: 4
- Stats at Pro Football Reference
- Stats at ArenaFan.com

Randy Hymes (born August 7, 1979) is an American former professional football player who was a wide receiver in the National Football League (NFL). He played college football for the Grambling State Tigers and was signed by the Baltimore Ravens as an undrafted free agent in 2002.

Hymes was also a member of the Jacksonville Jaguars and Minnesota Vikings.
