= Tony Colston =

American football player (born 1981)

Profile
- Position: Quarterback

Personal information
- Born: June 24, 1981 (age 45)
- Listed height: 6 ft 4 in (1.93 m)
- Listed weight: 205 lb (93 kg)

Career information
- High school: Clinton (Clinton, Tennessee)
- College: Tennessee Tech, Tusculum
- NFL draft: 2005: undrafted

Career history
- Tennessee Valley Vipers (2006); CenTex Barracudas (2006); Tennessee Valley Vipers (2007); Odessa Roughnecks (2008); Tennessee Valley/Alabama Vipers (2008–2010); Bolzano Giants (2011); Knoxville NightHawks (2012); Georgia Force (2012); Alabama Hammers (2012); Georgia Force (2012)

Awards and highlights
- ArenaCup champion (2008); ArenaCup Offensive Player of the Game (2008); Second-team All-SAC (2003)
- Stats at ArenaFan.com

Antonio Colston (born June 24, 1981) is an American former professional football quarterback. He played college football at Tennessee Tech and Tusculum. He was a member of the Tennessee Valley Vipers of the af2, the CenTex Barracudas and Odessa Roughnecks of the Intense Football League (IFL), the Alabama Vipers and Georgia Force of the Arena Football League (AFL), the Bolzano Giants of the Italian Football League, and the Knoxville NightHawks and Alabama Hammers of the Professional Indoor Football League (PIFL).

== Early life ==
Colston played high school football at Clinton High School in Clinton, Tennessee and threw for a total of over 3,000 yards and 31 touchdowns for his junior and senior seasons combined.

== College career ==
Colston was a member of the Tennessee Tech Golden Eagles in 2000.

After having to sit out the 2001 season, he played for the Tusculum Pioneers from 2002 to 2004, setting school records for completions with 544, completion percentage with .635, passing yards with 6,207, and total offensive yards with 6,964. He earned second-team All-South Atlantic Conference honors in 2003.

== Professional career ==
=== Tennessee Valley Vipers (first stint) ===
He began his professional football career with the Tennessee Valley Vipers of the af2 in 2006.

=== CenTex Barracudas ===
He joined the CenTex Barracudas of the Intense Football League (IFL) later in 2006 and completed 88 of 170 passes for 1,133 yards and 29 touchdowns with 9 interceptions.

=== Tennessee Valley Vipers (second stint) ===
He rejoined the Vipers in 2007 and completed 96 of 171 passes for 941 yards and 16 touchdowns with 9 interceptions. He missed 7 games due to a dislocated elbow on his non-throwing arm. In November 2007, he re-signed with the Vipers for the 2008 season.

=== Odessa Roughnecks ===
He signed with the Odessa Roughnecks of the IFL in March 2008 after starting quarterback Dennis Gile was injured.

=== Tennessee Valley/Alabama Vipers (third stint) ===
He rejoined the Vipers for the third time later in 2008. After starter Kevin Eakin injured his ankle on the first drive of ArenaCup IX on August 25, 2008, Colston, who had only attempted four passes all season, entered the game as Eakin's replacement. Colston then proceeded to complete 20 of 30 passes for 288 yards and seven touchdowns with no interceptions while scoring the game-winning 2-point conversion on a rushing attempt in overtime to defeat Nick Davila and the Spokane Shock by a score of 56–55. He was named the Schutt Offensive Player of the game. In February 2009, the af2 announced that ArenaCup IX had been named the greatest game in league history by a group of current and former af2 head coaches, media members, and fans.

In October 2008, he was reassigned to the Vipers for the 2009 season. The Vipers moved to the Arena Football League (AFL) in 2010 and were renamed the Alabama Vipers. After an injury to Kevin Eakin and poor play by backup Stephen Wasil, Colston made his first AFL start on May 22, 2010, throwing for 238 yards and five touchdowns while also rushing for a touchdown in a 56–19 victory over the Bossier–Shreveport Battle Wings. Overall, he completed 65 of 118 passes for 817 yards and 14 touchdowns with 4 interceptions while also rushing for 3 scores during the 2010 season. The Vipers folded after the 2010 season.

=== Bolzano Giants ===
He played with the Bolzano Giants of the Italian Football League in 2011.

=== Knoxville NightHawks ===
In October 2011, Colston signed with the Knoxville NightHawks of the Professional Indoor Football League (PIFL) for the 2012 season. He completed 62 of 122 passes for 731 yards and 13 touchdowns with 10 interceptions in 5 games before being released on April 24.

=== Georgia Force (first stint) ===
He was assigned to the Georgia Force of the AFL on May 10, 2012. He was reassigned on May 16, 2012.

=== Alabama Hammers ===
He signed with the Alabama Hammers of the PIFL in May 2012 after Hammers rookie Arvell Nelson was benched. However, Colston was also benched and replaced by Nelson after completing 38 of 78 passes for 357 yards, and 9 touchdowns with 3 interceptions in 2 starts, both losses.

=== Georgia Force (second stint) ===
Colston was assigned to the Force again in June 2012 before being reassigned in July 2012.

== Personal life ==
Colston later started a quarterback training program called The Gunslinger Academy.
