= 2010 Milwaukee Iron season =

Arena Football League team season

- Head coach: Bob Landsee
- Home stadium: Bradley Center (regular season); U.S. Cellular Arena (playoffs)

Results
- Record: 10–5
- Division place: 1st NC Midwest
- Playoffs: Won Conference semifinals (Rush) 64–54; Lost Conference Championship (Shock) 57–60
- Team OPY: Chris Greisen

The 2010 Milwaukee Iron season was the second season for the franchise, and the first in the Arena Football League (AFL), coming from the AF2, which dissolved following the 2009 season. The team was coached by Bob Landsee and played their home games at Bradley Center. For the opening round of the playoffs, the Iron played at U.S. Cellular Arena. The Iron won the Midwest Division to qualify for the playoffs, and defeated the Chicago Rush in the conference semifinals, 64–54. Advancing to the National Conference Championship, their season ended after losing on the road to the top-seeded Spokane Shock, 57–60.

== Standings ==
Midwest Division
Team	W	L	PCT	PF	PA	DIV	CON	Home	Away
y-Milwaukee Iron	11	5	.687	1043	903	5–1	8–3	7–1	4–4
x-Chicago Rush	10	6	.625	906	873	4–2	8–3	5–3	5–3
Cleveland Gladiators	7	9	.438	938	906	2–4	4–6	4–4	3–5
Iowa Barnstormers	7	9	.438	829	833	1–5	3–7	2–6	5–3

y - Clinched division
x - Clinched playoff berth

== Regular season schedule ==
The Iron started their season on the road against the Shock on April 2. Their first home game took place on April 16 against the Barnstormers. The conclusion of their regular season took place in Cleveland against the Gladiators on July 31.

Week	Day	Date	Kickoff	Opponent	Results		Location	Report
Week	Day	Date	Kickoff	Opponent	Score	Record	Location	Report
1	Friday	April 2	11:00 pm	at Spokane Shock	W 74–62	1–0	Spokane Veterans Memorial Arena	^{[usurped]}
2	Bye							
3	Friday	April 16	8:30 pm	Iowa Barnstormers	W 65–48	2–0	Bradley Center	^{[usurped]}
4	Saturday	April 24	8:00 pm	Tampa Bay Storm	W 72–61	3–0	Bradley Center	
5	Saturday	May 1	8:30 pm	at Alabama Vipers	L 67–75	3–1	Von Braun Center	
6	Friday	May 7	8:30 pm	Chicago Rush	W 71–48	4–1	Bradley Center	
7	Friday	May 14	8:00 pm	Utah Blaze	W 56–55 (OT)	5–1	Bradley Center	
8	Friday	May 21	7:30 pm	at Orlando Predators	L 54–58	5–2	Amway Arena	
9	Saturday	May 29	8:00 pm	Dallas Vigilantes	W 63–38	6–2	Bradley Center	
10	Saturday	June 5	10:30 pm	at Arizona Rattlers	L 67–68 (OT)	6–3	US Airways Center	^{[usurped]}
11	Saturday	June 12	8:00 pm	Cleveland Gladiators	W 84–58	7–3	Bradley Center	^{[usurped]}
12	Saturday	June 19	8:00 pm	at Chicago Rush	L 56–63	7–4	Allstate Arena	^{[usurped]}
13	Saturday	June 26	8:00 pm	Spokane Shock	L 48–62	7–5	Bradley Center	^{[usurped]}
14	Saturday	July 3	7:00 pm	at Utah Blaze	W 82–56	8–5	Maverik Center	
15	Bye							
16	Saturday	July 17	8:00 pm	Orlando Predators	W 57–41	9–5	Bradley Center	
17	Saturday	July 24	8:05 pm	at Iowa Barnstormers	W 75–67	10–5	Wells Fargo Arena	
18	Saturday	July 31	7:00 pm	at Cleveland Gladiators	W 54–47	11–5	Quicken Loans Arena	

== Playoff schedule ==
Round	Day	Date	Kickoff	Opponent	Score	Location	Report
NC Semifinals	Saturday	August 7	8:00 pm	Chicago Rush	W 64–54	U.S. Cellular Arena	
NC Championship	Thursday	August 12	8:00 pm	at Spokane Shock	L 57–60	Spokane Veterans Memorial Arena	

All times are EDT

== Final roster ==
2010 Milwaukee Iron roster
Quarterbacks: 13 Chris Crane; 14 Chris Greisen; Fullbacks: 49 Remond Willis; 27 Tyre Young; Wide receivers: 4 Antoine Burns; 21 Damian Harrell; 2 Tiger Jones	Offensive linemen: 86 Corey Davis; 50 Raymond McNeil; 83 Rich Ranglin; 69 Nick Zeck; Defensive linemen: 57 LeRoy Burgess; 97 Zarnell Fitch; 71 Jack Rustman; 17 Khreem Smith; 12 Joe Sykes	Linebackers: 8 Marcus Everett; 7 Tyus Jackson; Defensive backs: 6 Tracy Belton; 3 Virgil Gray; 5 Perry Kyles; 9 Alfred Phillips; Kickers: 19 Rob Forstrom	Injured reserve: 53 Brandon Barnes OL (IR); 11 Carlton Brown DB (IR); 10 Nate Forse WR (IR); -- Marcus Jefferson DB (IR); 80 Aaron Kelly WR (IR); -- Terry Love DB (IR); 22 Brandon Register DB (IR); -- Eric Turner OL (IR); Refuse to report: Currently vacant; League suspension: -- Kheon Hendricks OL (Susp.); Other league exempt: Currently vacant; Inactive reserve: Currently vacant; Rookies in italics Roster updated July 24, 2010; 23 Active, 9 Inactive → More rosters

== Regular season ==
=== Week 1: at Spokane Shock ===
Quarter	1	2	3	4	Total
Iron	6	28	14	26	74
Shock	7	14	7	34	62

at Spokane Veterans Memorial Arena, Spokane, Washington

- Date: April 2
- Game time: 11:00 pm EDT
- Game attendance: 10,500
- Referee: Shane Anderson
- Recap^{[usurped]}

Game information

1st quarter

- Spokane – Huey Whittaker 12-yard pass from Kyle Rowley (Taylor Rowan kick), 4:00
- Milwaukee – Anthony Jones 5-yard pass from Chris Greisen (Robert Forstrom kick no good), 1:26

2nd quarter

- Milwaukee – Nate Forse 19-yard pass from Chris Greisen (Robert Forstrom kick),
- Spokane – Branden Hall 1-yard pass from Kyle Rowley (Taylor Rowan kick), 3:21
- Milwaukee – Anthony Jones 9-yard pass from Chris Greisen (Robert Forstrom kick), 0:54
- Spokane – Huey Whittaker 12-yard pass from Kyle Rowley (Taylor Rowan kick), 0:31
- Milwaukee – Damian Harrell 19-yard pass from Chris Greisen (Robert Forstrom kick), 0:18
- Milwaukee – Raul Vijil 9-yard interception return (Robert Forstrom kick), 0:00

3rd quarter

- Milwaukee – Anthony Jones 6-yard pass from Chris Greisen (Robert Forstrom kick), 8:23
- Spokane – Markee White 31-yard pass from Kyle Rowley (Taylor Rowan kick), 6:09
- Milwaukee – Nate Forse 5-yard pass from Chris Greisen (Robert Forstrom kick), 2:37

4th quarter

- Spokane – Markee White 8-yard pass from Kyle Rowley (Taylor Rowan kick), 14:19
- Milwaukee – Damian Harrell 13-yard pass from Chris Greisen (Robert Forstrom kick), 13:58
- Spokane – Quorey Payne 58-yard kickoff return (Taylor Rowan kick), 13:09
- Spokane – Huey Whittaker 9-yard pass from Kyle Rowley (Taylor Rowan kick), 9:32
- Milwaukee – Tyre Young 2-yard run (Robert Forstrom kick no good), 3:27
- Spokane – Kyle Rowley 1-yard run (Taylor Rowan kick), 0:55
- Milwaukee – Nate Forse 17-yard pass from Chris Greisen (Robert Forstrom kick), 0:52
- Milwaukee – Anthony Jones 11-yard pass from Chris Greisen (Robert Forstrom kick no good), 0:35
- Spokane – Huey Whittaker Kyle Rowley 15-yard pass from Kyle Rowley, 0:00

Passing

- Milwaukee – Chris Greisen: 29/35, 317 yards, 9 TD
- Spokane – Kyle Rowley: 29/35, 259 yards, 7 TD, 3 INT

Rushing

- Milwaukee – Tyre Young: 5 att, 41 yards, 1 TD
- Spokane – Kyle Rowley: 2 att, 8 yards, 1 TD

Receiving

- Milwaukee – Nate Forse: 11 rec, 128 yards, 3 TD
- Spokane – Huey Whittaker: 11 rec, 97 yards, 4 TD

The Iron took down the previous year's ArenaCup champions behind the arm of Chris Greisen. Scoring was scarce in the 1st quarter, with each team putting only a touchdown on the board. In the 2nd quarter, both teams combined for five touchdowns in the final minute before halftime, with the Iron intercepting a pass and returning for a touchdown as time expired, allowing them to take a 34–21 lead. In the 2nd half, the two teams matched one touchdown with another until the 4th quarter when the Shock made it a one-possession game. However a late interception by the Iron, followed by a touchdown on the ensuing drive, sealed the win for them, despite giving up a touchdown to Spokane as time expired.

Chris Greisen threw for 317 yards and 9 touchdowns and did not throw a single interception. Nate Forse was the leading receiver for the Iron with 128 yards and 3 touchdowns.

=== Week 3: vs. Iowa Barnstormers ===
Quarter	1	2	3	4	Total
Barnstormers	6	13	15	14	48
Iron	16	14	14	21	65

at Bradley Center, Milwaukee, Wisconsin

- Date: April 16
- Game time: 8:30 pm EDT
- Game attendance: 5,032
- Referee: Bob McElwee
- Recap^{[usurped]}

Game information

1st quarter

- Milwaukee – Greisen 16-yard pass from Forse (Forstrom kick no good), 12:42
- Milwaukee – Greisen 4-yard pass from Jones (Forstrom kick), 8:58
- Iowa – Vena 20-yard pass from Blythe (Glas kick no good), 6:02
- Milwaukee – Forstrom 19-yard field goal, 1:30

2nd quarter

- Iowa – Vena 12-yard pass from Schmidt (2-point conversion no good), 14:52
- Milwaukee – Greisen 20-yard pass from Forse (Forstrom kick), 11:56
- Iowa – Vena 7-yard pass from Dodge (Glas kick), 7:28
- Milwaukee – Greisen 22-yard pass from Forse (Forstrom kick), 4:10

3rd quarter

- Milwaukee – Greisen 22-yard pass from Forse (Forstrom kick), 10:28
- Iowa – Vena 6-yard pass from Blythe (Glas kick), 7:26
- Milwaukee – Greisen 43-yard pass from Jones (Forstrom kick), 5:57
- Iowa – Vena 1-yard run (Vena pass to Dodge), 0:31

4th quarter

- Milwaukee – Greisen 33-yard pass from Jones (Forstrom kick), 14:26
- Iowa – McCown 15-yard pass from Vena (Glas kick), 12:26
- Milwaukee – Greisen 4-yard pass from Jones (Forstrom kick), 7:47
- Iowa – Vena 31-yard pass from Blythe (Glas kick), 5:19
- Milwaukee – Young 5-yard run (Forstrom kick), 4:33

Passing

- Iowa – Ryan Vena: 24/37, 252 yards, 6 TD, 2 INT
- Milwaukee – Chris Greisen: 25/36, 382 yards, 7 TD, 0 INT

Rushing

- Iowa – Ryan Vena 7 att, 12 yards, 1 TD
- Milwaukee – Tyre Young: 4 att, 13 yards, 1 TD

Receiving

- Iowa – Todd Blythe: 9 rec, 118 yards, 3 TD
- Milwaukee – Tiger Jones: 12 rec, 171 yards, 3 TD

Two Midwestern foes found themselves head to head this weekend. The Iowa Barnstormers traveled to Milwaukee, Wisconsin to take on the Iron in their first of two meetings this season. Milwaukee won their home opener in front of the crowd of 5,032 Iron faithful. QB Chris Greisen continued his dominance at the quarterback position, throwing 25-of-36 for 382 yards and seven touchdowns. Greisen has yet to throw an interception this season. While Greisen continues to shine, it is his offensive counterparts that are successful in bringing the ball into the end zone. WRs Nate Forse and Anthony “Tiger” Jones have proven to be Greisen's perfect receiving duo. Jones brought in three touchdowns on 12 catches for 171 yards this weekend, while Forse made 10 catches for 146 yards and three scores. Greisen's seventh touchdown was caught by Alvance Robinson. Not to be outdone, Milwaukee's defense also helped to hold off and Barnstormers serge. Marcus Everett intercepted QB Ryan Vena's first possession of the game, eventually leading to an Iron score. Milwaukee managed to pull ahead 13–0 before the Barnstormers got into the game. WR Todd Blythe, known for his athletic catches, caught a pass deep in the corner of the end zone to bring the score to 6–13, but Milwaukee would never once trail throughout the game.

Iowa's QB Vena was intercepted twice, including a game-highlighting play. Milwaukee's Virgil Gray nabbed an erratic Vena pass in the end zone, not only disrupting a score for the Barnstormers, but also proceeded to run the ball back 58 yards for a score of his own. Despite two players leaving with injuries in the second half, Milwaukee was able to hold off the Barnstormers and come away with the 17-point win.

=== Week 4: vs. Tampa Bay Storm ===
Quarter	1	2	3	4	Total
Storm	14	20	14	13	61
Iron	14	17	21	20	72

at Bradley Center, Milwaukee, Wisconsin

- Date: April 25
- Game time: 5:00 pm EDT
- Game attendance: 4,049
- Referee: Bob McElwee
- Recap

Game information

1st quarter

- Milwaukee – Damian Harrell 15-yard pass from Chris Greisen (Robert Forstrom kick), 11:52
- Tampa Bay – Hank Edwards Edwards 17-yard pass from Brett Dietz (Garrett Rivas kick), 9:22
- Milwaukee – Anthony Jones 7-yard pass from Chris Greisen (Robert Forstrom kick), 6:15
- Tampa Bay – Cleannord Saintil 1-yard run (Garrett Rivas kick), 1:12

2nd quarter

- Milwaukee – Damian Harrell 8-yard pass from Chris Greisen (Robert Forstrom kick), 11:29
- Tampa Bay – Cleannord Saintil 11-yard pass from Brett Dietz (Garrett Rivas kick), 6:40
- Milwaukee – Tyre Young 3-yard run (Robert Forstrom kick), 3:15
- Tampa Bay – Tyrone Timmons 36-yard pass from Brett Dietz (Garrett Rivas kick), 0:56
- Milwaukee – Robert Forstrom 13-yard field goal
- Tampa Bay – Cleannord Saintil 32-yard pass from Brett Dietz (Garrett Rivas kick no good), 0:21

3rd quarter

- Tampa Bay – Cleannord Saintil 15-yard pass from Brett Dietz (Garrett Rivas kick), 13:39
- Milwaukee – Damian Harrell 4-yard pass from Chris Greisen (Robert Forstrom kick), 9:03
- Milwaukee – Anthony Jones 5-yard pass from Chris Greisen (Robert Forstrom kick), 6:33
- Tampa Bay – Cleannord Saintil 20-yard pass from Brett Dietz (Garrett Rivas kick), 5:11
- Milwaukee – Anthony Jones 6-yard pass from Chris Greisen (Robert Forstrom kick), 1:17

4th quarter

- Milwaukee – Chris Greisen 2-yard run (Robert Forstrom kick), 8:44
- Tampa Bay – Cleannord Saintil 1-yard run (Garrett Rivas kick no good), 5:08
- Milwaukee – Nate Forse 9-yard pass from Chris Greisen (Robert Forstrom kick), 3:48
- Tampa Bay – Tyrone Timmons 35-yard pass from Brett Dietz (Garrett Rivas kick), 1:55
- Milwaukee – Tyre Young 1-yard run (Robert Forstrom kick no good), 0:44

Passing

- Tampa Bay – Brett Dietz: 21/34, 316 yards, 7 TD, 2 INT
- Milwaukee – Chris Greisen: 26/41, 270 yards, 7 TD

Rushing

- Tampa Bay – Cleannord Saintil: 1 att, 5 yards, 2 TD
- Milwaukee – Tyre Young: 10 att, 44 yards, 2 TD

Receiving

- Tampa Bay – Cleannord Saintil: 9 rec, 128 yards, 4 TD
- Milwaukee – Nate Forse: 8 rec, 120 yards, 4 TD

Trailing at halftime for the first time in the season by a score of 34–31, the Iron capitalized on Tampa Bay's turnovers to stay undefeated and keep up with the also undefeated Chicago Rush. One key turnover for Milwaukee was a fumble recovery inside their own 5-yard line after the defense had just been flagged for an illegal defense, which gave the Storm an automatic 1st down instead of facing 4th and goal. Following the turnover, quarterback Chris Greisen led the Iron to the end zone by taking it there himself for his first rushing touchdown of the season. Taking an 11-point lead in the 4th quarter, the Iron were ahead for good. Griesen finished with 270 passing yards and 8 total touchdowns. Carlton Brown and Perry Kyles each had an interception on defense.

=== Week 5: at Alabama Vipers ===
Quarter	1	2	3	4	Total
Iron	7	33	13	14	67
Vipers	7	28	19	21	75

at Von Braun Center, Huntsville, Alabama

- Date: May 1
- Game time: 8:30 pm EDT
- Game attendance: 5,070
- Referee: Marc Curles
- Recap

Game information

1st quarter

- Alabama – C.J. Johnson 4-yard pass from Kevin Eakin (Brian Jackson kick), 9:42
- Milwaukee – Nate Forse 7-yard pass from Chris Greisen (Chris Greisen kick), 3:56

2nd quarter

- Milwaukee – Nate Forse 7-yard pass from Chris Greisen (Robert Forstrom kick), 12:13
- Alabama – Larry Shipp 13-yard pass from Kevin Eakin (Brian Jackson kick), 9:58
- Milwaukee – Carlton Brown 50-yard kickoff return (Robert Forstrom kick), 9:10
- Alabama – Michael Johnson 33-yard pass from Kevin Eakin (Brian Jackson kick), 8:13
- Milwaukee – Damian Harrell 23-yard pass from Chris Greisen (Robert Forstrom kick), 6:43
- Alabama – Jeremy Grier 14-yard pass from Kevin Eakin (Brian Jackson kick) 4:55
- Milwaukee – Damian Harrell 13-yard pass from Chris Greisen (Robert Forstrom kick no good), 0:43
- Alabama – C.J. Johnson 20-yard pass from Kevin Eakin (Brian Jackson kick), 0:18
- Milwaukee – Anthony Jones 7-yard pass from Chris Greisen (Robert Forstrom kick blocked), 0:02

3rd quarter

- Alabama – Dan Alexander 7-yard run (Brian Jackson kick), 13:44
- Milwaukee – Nate Forse 14-yard pass from Chris Greisen (Robert Forstrom kick), 11:54
- Alabama – Dan Alexander 2-yard run (Brian Jackson kick), 7:57
- Milwaukee – Damian Harrell 9-yard pass from Chris Greisen (Robert Forstrom kick blocked), 6:47
- Alabama – Brian Jackson 8-yard field goal, 2:51

4th quarter

- Alabama – C.J. Johnson 11-yard pass from Kevin Eakin (Brian Jackson kick), 13:20
- Alabama – Larry Shipp 20-yard pass from Kevin Eakin (Brian Jackson kick), 5:45
- Milwaukee – Anthony Jones 8-yard pass from Chris Greisen (Robert Forstrom kick), 3:23
- Alabama – Larry Shipp 48-yard run (Brian Jackson kick), 1:14
- Milwaukee – Nate Forse 14-yard pass from Chris Greisen (Robert Forstrom kick), 0:39

Passing

- Milwaukee – Chris Greisen: 33/46, 360 yards, 9 TD
- Alabama – Kevin Eakin: 19/26, 221 yards, 7 TD

Rushing

- Milwaukee – Anthony Jones: 1 att, 4 yards
- Alabama – Larry Shipp: 2 att, 68 yards, 1 TD

Receiving

- Milwaukee – Nate Forse: 15 rec, 207 yards, 4 TD
- Alabama – C.J. Johnson: 7 rec, 91 yards, 3 TD

The Iron suffered their first loss of the season after dropping a close game to the Vipers. After a high-scoring 2nd quarter, Milwaukee led 40–35 at halftime, but after 3 quarters they trailed by just one point. A fumble by Anthony Jones was recovered by the Vipers on the Iron's first drive of the 4th quarter, allowing the Vipers to add to their lead on the ensuing drive. The Iron pulled to within 8 points following an 8-yard receiving touchdown by Jones, but on Alabama's next drive, Larry Shipp scored on a 48-yard rushing play to increase the Vipers' lead to 75–60 with 1:14 left. The Iron put together another touchdown drive ending on a 14-yard pass to Nate Forse with 39 seconds on the clock, but Milwaukee's onside kick attempt was recovered by the Vipers, who ran out the clock to end the game. Chris Greisen completed 33 passes for 360 yards and 9 touchdowns. Nate Forse was the leading receiver for the second consecutive game with 207 yards and 4 touchdowns.

=== Week 6: vs. Chicago Rush ===
Quarter	1	2	3	4	Total
Rush	20	7	7	14	48
Iron	7	20	34	10	71

at Bradley Center, Milwaukee, Wisconsin

- Date: May 7
- Game time: 8:30 pm EDT
- Game attendance: 5,386
- Referee: Bob McElwee
- Recap

Game information

1st quarter

- Chicago – Kenny Higgins 26-yard pass from Russ Michna (Chris Gould kick blocked), 10:26
- Milwaukee – Nate Forse 38-yard pass from Chris Greisen (Robert Forstrom kick), 9:10
- Chicago – Shawn McMackin 31-yard pass from Nichiren Flowers (Chris Gould kick), 6:45
- Chicago – Kenny Higgins 29-yard pass from Russ Michna (Chris Gould kick), 0:00

2nd quarter

- Milwaukee – Anthony Jones 28-yard pass from Chris Greisen (Robert Forstrom kick), 12:45
- Milwaukee – Tyre Young 6-yard run (Robert Forstrom kick blocked), 10:46
- Chicago – Russ Michna 4-yard run (Chris Gould kick), 7:11
- Milwaukee – Tyre Young 2-yard run (Robert Forstrom kick), 1:43

3rd quarter

- Milwaukee – Alvance Robinson 38-yard pass from Chris Greisen (Robert Forstrom kick), 13:46
- Milwaukee – Marcus Everett 9-yard interception return (Robert Forstrom kick), 9:44
- Milwaukee – Nate Forse 0-yard fumble return (Robert Forstrom kick), 7:36
- Milwaukee – Marcus Everett 46-yard interception return (Robert Forstrom kick no good), 5:26
- Chicago – Robert Boss 18-yard pass from Russ Michna (Chris Gould kick), 4:28
- Milwaukee – Nate Forse 20-yard pass from Chris Greisen (Robert Forstrom kick), 0:00

4th quarter

- Chicago – Samie Parker 32-yard pass from Russ Michna (Chris Gould kick), 13:32
- Milwaukee – Nate Forse 26-yard pass from Chris Greisen (Robert Forstrom kick), 9:48
- Milwaukee – Robert Forstrom 25-yard field goal, 2:19
- Chicago – Russ Michna 4-yard run (Chris Gould kick), 0:11

Passing

- Chicago – Russ Michna: 21/33, 354 yards, 4 TD, 2 INT
- Milwaukee – Chris Greisen: 26/30, 339 yards, 5 TD

Rushing

- Chicago – Russ Michna: 4 att, 4 yards, 2 TD
- Milwaukee – Tyre Young: 5 att, 14 yards, 2 TD

Receiving

- Chicago – Kenny Higgins: 9 rec, 157 yards, 2 TD
- Milwaukee – Nate Forse: 10 rec, 171 yards, 3 TD

Though the game was tied 27–27 at halftime, the Iron took control of the game in the 3rd quarter. They scored on the opening drive of the half with a 38-yard touchdown catch by Alvance Robinson. Later, Marcus Everett intercepted a pass and returned it 6 yards for a touchdown. On the ensuing kickoff, Tyre Young stripped the ball from the Chicago returner. Nate Forse recovered the fumble in the end zone for another Iron touchdown. On the Rush's next drive, Marcus Everett picked off a pass with one hand and returned it 46 yards for the score. On the final play of the quarter, Chris Greisen hooked up with Forse for a 20-yard passing touchdown, giving the Iron a 61–34 lead. Milwaukee went on to win the game 71–48, giving Chicago their first loss of the season, and moving the Iron into first place in the Midwest Division. Greisen finished with 339 yards and 5 touchdowns, while Forse caught for 171 yards and 3 touchdowns. Young had 5 carries in the game, two of which were touchdowns.

=== Week 7: vs. Utah Blaze ===
Quarter	1	2	3	4	OT	Total
Blaze	7	20	14	7	7	55
Iron	13	14	14	7	8	56

at Bradley Center, Milwaukee, Wisconsin

- Date: May 14
- Game time: 8:00 pm EDT
- Game attendance: 6,815
- Referee: Bob McElwee
- Recap

Game information

1st quarter

- Milwaukee – Anthony Jones 25-yard pass from Chris Greisen (Robert Forstrom kick no good), 13:01
- Milwaukee – Nate Forse 27-yard pass from Chris Greisen (Robert Forstrom kick), 8:07
- Utah – Aaron Boone 11-yard pass from Brett Elliott (Ben Scott kick), 2:40

2nd quarter

- Milwaukee – Anthony Jones 16-yard pass from Chris Greisen (Robert Forstrom kick), 11:31
- Utah – Akamu Aki 32-yard pass from Brett Elliott (Ben Scott kick), 7:48
- Milwaukee – Damian Harrell 8-yard pass from Chris Greisen (Robert Forstrom kick), 3:15
- Utah – Aaron Boone 1-yard pass from Brett Elliott (Ben Scott kick no good), 0:37
- Utah – Aaron Boone 11-yard pass from Brett Elliott (Ben Scott kick), 0:03

3rd quarter

- Utah – Aaron Boone 12-yard pass from Brett Elliott (Ben Scott kick), 10:15
- Milwaukee – Tyre Young 3-yard run (Robert Forstrom kick), 6:30
- Utah – Aaron Boone 4-yard pass from Brett Elliott (Ben Scott kick), 3:05
- Milwaukee – Anthony Jones 50-yard pass from Chris Greisen (Robert Forstrom kick), 0:15

4th quarter

- Utah – Aaron Boone 3-yard pass from Brett Elliott (Ben Scott kick), 12:03
- Milwaukee – Anthony Jones 3-yard run (Robert Forstrom kick), 8:41

Overtime

- Utah – Aaron Boone 12-yard pass from Brett Elliott (Ben Scott kick), 13:46
- Milwaukee – Anthony Jones 43-yard pass from Chris Greisen (Nate Forse pass)

Passing

- Utah – Brett Elliott: 23/42, 273 yards, 8 TD, 2 INT
- Milwaukee – Chris Greisen: 21/34, 308 yards, 6 TD, 1 INT

Rushing

- Utah – Brett Elliott: 1 att, 6 yards
- Milwaukee – Tyre Young: 4 att, 8 yards, 1 TD

Receiving

- Utah – Akamu Aki: 6 rec, 111 yards, 1 TD
- Milwaukee – Anthony Jones: 7 rec, 119 yards, 4 TD

In their first ever nationally televised game, it took overtime for the Iron to defeat the blaze. Milwaukee won the overtime coin toss but decided to give Utah the ball first. Utah's Aaron Boone caught his seventh touchdown of the game to give his team a 55–48 lead. Greisen, who threw for 308 yards and six touchdowns, then hit a wide-open Jones in the middle of the field for a 43-yard touchdown to make the score 55–54. Greisen then connected with Nate Forse for the two-point conversion to end the game. Overshadowed in the crazy ending was the fact Milwaukee wide receiver Damian Harrell set the Arena Football League all-time record for career receiving yards. He had six catches for 75 yards to increase his all-time total to 13,398 yards.

=== Week 8: at Orlando Predators ===
Quarter	1	2	3	4	Total
Iron	7	15	10	22	54
Predators	17	7	7	27	58

at Amway Arena, Orlando, Florida

- Date: May 21
- Game time: 7:30 pm EDT
- Game attendance: 10,333
- Referee: Greg LeFils
- Recap

Game information

1st quarter

- Orlando – Derrick Lewis 14-yard pass from Nick Hill (Dion Bynum kick), 11:06
- Orlando – Dion Bynum 23-yard field goal, 8:34
- Orlando – Nick Hill 1-yard run (Carlos Martinez kick), 6:21
- Milwaukee – Damian Harrell 4-yard pass from Chris Greisen (Robert Forstrom kick), 3:10

2nd quarter

- Milwaukee – Damian Harrell 35-yard pass from Chris Greisen (Robert Forstrom kick no good), 12:36
- Orlando – Bobby Sippio 9-yard pass from Nick Hill (Carlos Martinez kick), 4:59
- Milwaukee – Tyre Young 7-yard run (Robert Forstrom kick), 0:57
- Milwaukee – Safety, 0:01

3rd quarter

- Milwaukee – Robert Forstrom 11-yard field goal, 7:50
- Orlando – T.T. Toliver 22-yard pass from Nick Hill (Carlos Martinez kick), 6:19
- Milwaukee – Anthony Jones 14-yard pass from Chris Greisen (Robert Forstrom kick), 1:03

4th quarter

- Orlando – Nick Hill 9-yard run (Carlos Martinez kick no good), 14:02
- Milwaukee – Nate Forse -yard pass from Chris Greisen (Robert Forstrom kick), 9:20
- Orlando – Derrick Lewis 3-yard pass from Nick Hill (Carlos Martinez kick), 3:12
- Milwaukee – Damian Harrell 16-yard pass from Chris Greisen (Anthony Jones pass), 1:00
- Orlando – Nick Hill 1-yard run (Carlos Martinez kick), 0:21
- Milwaukee – Anthony Jones 35-yard pass from Chris Greisen (Robert Forstrom kick), 0:13
- Orlando – Bobby Sippio 40-yard pass from Nick Hill (Carlos Martinez kick), 0:03

Passing

- Milwaukee – Chris Greisen: 27/43, 346 yards, 6 TD
- Orlando – Nick Hill: 20/32, 314 yards, 5 TD, 1 INT

Rushing

- Milwaukee – Tyre Young: 3 att, 14 yards, 1 TD
- Orlando – Nick Hill: 6 att, 21 yards, 3 TD

Receiving

- Milwaukee – Damian Harrell: 13 rec, 144 yards, 3 TD
- Orlando – T.T. Toliver: 6 rec, 122 yards, 1 TD

Orlando quarterback Nick Hill connected with Bobby Sippio for the winning touchdown with four seconds left as the Orlando Predators knocked off the Milwaukee Iron in a game that saw three touchdowns in the final 25 seconds. Hill scored on a two-yard run with 25 seconds left to give the Predators a 51–47 lead. The Iron answered when Chris Greisen hit Tiger Jones for a 35-yard touchdown pass with 14 seconds to play to make it 54–51. But Milwaukee's defense could not hold and Orlando pulled out the victory. Milwaukee receiver Damian Harrell became the AFL's all-time leader for receptions. He entered the game needing seven catches and finished with 13 receptions for a season-high 144 yards and three touchdowns.

=== Week 9: vs. Dallas Vigilantes ===
Quarter	1	2	3	4	Total
Vigilantes	7	10	7	14	38
Iron	13	14	16	20	63

at Bradley Center, Milwaukee, Wisconsin

- Date: May 29
- Game time: 8:00 pm EDT
- Referee: Bob McElwee
- Recap

Game information

1st quarter

- Milwaukee – Anthony Jones 7-yard pass from Chris Greisen (Robert Forstrom kick), 9:26
- Dallas – Derek Lee 3-yard pass from Collin Drafts (Mark Lewis kick), 6:59
- Milwaukee – Nate Forse 14-yard pass from Chris Greisen (Robert Forstrom kick blocked), 2:53

2nd quarter

- Milwaukee – Antoine Burns 17-yard pass from Chris Greisen (Robert Forstrom kick), 12:19
- Dallas – Kenny Henderson 8-yard pass from Collin Drafts (Mark Lewis kick), 9:58
- Dallas – Mark Lewis 12-yard field goal, 2:41
- Milwaukee – Tyre Young 7-yard run (Robert Forstrom kick), 0:27

3rd quarter

- Dallas – Kenny Henderson 5-yard pass from Collin Drafts (Mark Lewis kick), 11:16
- Milwaukee – Antoine Burns 29-yard pass from Chris Greisen (Robert Forstrom kick), 8:35
- Milwaukee – Safety, 7:47
- Milwaukee – Chris Greisen 1-yard run (Robert Forstrom kick), 2:52

4th quarter

- Dallas – Kenny Henderson 4-yard run (Mark Lewis kick), 14:21
- Milwaukee – Tyre Young 6-yard run (Robert Forstrom kick no good), 11:59
- Dallas – Kenny Henderson 1-yard run (Mark Lewis kick), 7:17
- Milwaukee – Nate Forse 8-yard pass from Chris Greisen (Robert Forstrom kick), 5:22
- Milwaukee – Antoine Burns 28-yard pass from Chris Greisen (Robert Forstrom kick), 0:32

Passing

- Dallas – Collin Drafts: 24/43, 237 yards, 3 TD
- Milwaukee – Chris Greisen: 23/36, 295 yards, 6 TD

Rushing

- Dallas – Collin Drafts: 4 att, 14 yards
- Milwaukee – Tyre Young: 4 att, 12 yards, 2 TD

Receiving

- Dallas – Matt Fields: 12 rec, 128 yards
- Milwaukee – Antoine Burns: 8 rec, 121 yards, 3 TD

In a battle of the two preseason favorites, Milwaukee quarterback Chris Greisen threw for 295 yards and six touchdowns in a 63–38 blowout of the Vigilantes. The Iron never trailed in Antoine Burns's season debut after returning from the DL. Burns caught eight passes for a team-high 3 touchdowns and 121 yards and filled in nicely for Damian Harrell, who did not play because of a sore hamstring. Nate Forse caught 10 passes for 103 yards and two touchdowns as well.

=== Week 10: at Arizona Rattlers ===
Quarter	1	2	3	4	OT	Total
Iron	6	24	13	17	7	67
Rattlers	13	21	7	19	8	68

at US Airways Center, Phoenix, Arizona

- Date: June 5
- Game time: 10:30 pm EDT
- Game attendance: 10,031
- Referee: Shawn Hochuli
- Recap^{[usurped]}

Game information

1st quarter

- Arizona – Rod Windsor 1-yard run (Johnie Kirton run no good), 10:35
- Milwaukee – Anthony Jones 38-yard pass from Chris Greisen (Robert Forstrom kick no good), 8:49
- Arizona – Rod Windsor 1-yard run (Fabrizio Scaccia kick), 2:48

2nd quarter

- Arizona – J.J. McKelvey 9-yard pass from Nick Davila (Fabrizio Scaccia kick), 11:00
- Milwaukee – Nate Forse 41-yard pass from Chris Greisen (Robert Forstrom kick), 9:10
- Milwaukee – Nate Forse 10-yard pass from Chris Greisen (Robert Forstrom kick), 4:59
- Arizona – Rod Windsor 12-yard pass from Nick Davila (Fabrizio Scaccia kick), 0:56
- Milwaukee – Tyre Young 49-yard run (Robert Forstrom kick), 0:37
- Arizona – Rod Windsor 15-yard pass from Nick Davila (Fabrizio Scaccia kick), 0:10
- Milwaukee – Robert Forstrom 35-yard field goal, 0:00

3rd quarter

- Milwaukee – Damian Harrell 17-yard pass from Chris Greisen (Robert Forstrom kick no good), 13:18
- Milwaukee – Anthony Jones 19-yard pass from Chris Greisen (Robert Forstrom kick), 6:30
- Arizona – J.J. McKelvey 14-yard pass from Nick Davila (Fabrizio Scaccia kick), 2:27

4th quarter

- Milwaukee – Nate Forse 2-yard pass from Chris Greisen (Robert Forstrom kick), 14:55
- Arizona – J.J. McKelvey 21-yard pass from Nick Davila (Billy Farris run no good), 11:19
- Milwaukee – Anthony Jones 4-yard pass from Chris Greisen (Robert Forstrom kick), 9:00
- Arizona – J.J. McKelvey 5-yard pass from Nick Davila (Fabrizio Scaccia kick), 4:12
- Arizona – J.J. McKelvey 31-yard pass from Nick Davila (Fabrizio Scaccia kick no good), 1:00
- Milwaukee – Robert Forstrom 20-yard field goal, 0:00

Overtime

- Milwaukee – Nate Forse 7-yard pass from Chris Greisen (Robert Forstrom kick), 9:23
- Arizona – Rod Windsor 11-yard pass from Nick Davila (Rod Windsor run)

Passing

- Milwaukee – Chris Greisen: 24/36, 397 yards, 8 TD, 3 INT
- Arizona – Nick Davila: 37/52, 420 yards, 8 TD, 2 INT

Rushing

- Milwaukee – Anthony Jones: 1 att, 6 yards
- Arizona – Rod Windsor: 2 att, 2 yards, 2 TD

Receiving

- Milwaukee – Anthony Jones: 7 rec, 156 yards, 3 TD
- Arizona – J.J. McKelvey: 14 rec, 186 yards, 5 TD

=== Week 11: vs. Cleveland Gladiators ===
Quarter	1	2	3	4	Total
Gladiators	14	27	7	6	54
Iron	13	28	21	20	82

at Bradley Center, Milwaukee, Wisconsin

- Date: June 12
- Game time: 8:00 pm EDT
- Recap^{[usurped]}

Game information

1st quarter

- Cleveland – Brent Holmes 10-yard pass from John Dutton (Matt Denny kick), 14:26
- Milwaukee – Anthony Jones 9-yard pass from Chris Greisen (Robert Forstrom kick no good), 8:25
- Cleveland – Chris Johnson 15-yard pass from John Dutton (Matt Denny kick), 4:45
- Milwaukee – Tyre Young 1-yard run (Robert Forstrom kick), 1:00

2nd quarter

- Cleveland – Russell Monk 1-yard run (Matt Denny kick blocked), 11:13
- Milwaukee – Anthony Jones 12-yard pass from Chris Greisen (Robert Forstrom kick), 9:09
- Cleveland – Chris Johnson 7-yard pass from John Dutton (Matt Denny kick), 6:46
- Milwaukee – Antoine Burns 57-yard kickoff return (Robert Forstrom kick), 5:54
- Cleveland – Ben Nelson 17-yard pass from John Dutton (Matt Denny kick), 4:09
- Milwaukee – Anthony Jones 18-yard pass from Chris Greisen (Robert Forstrom kick), 0:47
- Cleveland – Ben Nelson 22-yard pass from John Dutton (Matt Denny kick), 0:22
- Milwaukee – Anthony Jones 29-yard pass from Chris Greisen (Robert Forstrom kick), 0:09

3rd quarter

- Milwaukee – Tyre Young 2-yard run (Robert Forstrom kick), 12:45
- Milwaukee – Perry Kyles 3-yard kickoff return (Robert Forstrom kick), 12:03
- Cleveland – Ben Nelson 10-yard pass from John Dutton (Matt Denny kick), 8:25
- Milwaukee – Antoine Burns 38-yard pass from Chris Greisen (Robert Forstrom kick), 6:40

4th quarter

- Milwaukee – Tracy Belton 48-yard fumble return (Robert Forstrom kick), 12:43
- Milwaukee – Anthony Jones 23-yard pass from Chris Greisen (Robert Forstrom kick), 4:27
- Cleveland – Brent Holmes 2-yard pass from John Dutton (Matt Denny kick no good), 0:29
- Milwaukee – Anthony Jones 12-yard pass from Chris Crane (Robert Forstrom kick blocked), 0:23
- Cleveland – John Dutton: 30/45, 324 yards, 7 TD
- Milwaukee – Chris Greisen: 23/28, 286 yards, 6 TD

Rushing

- Cleveland – Chris Johnson: 1 att, 11 yards
- Milwaukee – Tyre Young: 5 att, 19 yards, 2 TD

Receiving

- Cleveland – Ben Nelson: 13 rec, 152 yards, 3 TD
- Milwaukee – Anthony Jones: 11 rec, 138 yards, 6 TD

=== Week 12: at Chicago Rush ===
Quarter	1	2	3	4	Total
Iron	14	21	14	7	56
Rush	7	14	21	21	63

at Allstate Arena, Rosemont, Illinois

- Date: June 19
- Game time: 8:00 pm EDT
- Game attendance: 8,287
- Referee: Tom McCabe
- Recap^{[usurped]}

Game information

1st quarter

- Milwaukee – Anthony Jones 32-yard pass from Chris Greisen (Robert Forstrom kick), 13:15
- Milwaukee – Tyre Young 2-yard run (Robert Forstrom kick), 3:23
- Chicago – Travis LaTendresse 15-yard pass from J.J. Raterink (Chris Gould kick), 0:58

2nd quarter

- Milwaukee – Damian Harrell 3-yard pass from Chris Greisen (Robert Forstrom kick), 10:33
- Milwaukee – Perry Kyles 4-yard fumble return (Robert Forstrom kick), 5:46
- Chicago – Travis LaTendresse 26-yard pass from J.J. Raterink (Chris Gould kick), 3:16
- Milwaukee – Anthony Jones 34-yard pass from Chris Greisen (Robert Forstrom kick), 1:07
- Chicago – Syvelle Newton 21-yard pass from J.J. Raterink (Chris Gould kick), 0:20

3rd quarter

- Chicago – Robert Boss 2-yard run (Chris Gould kick), 12:21
- Milwaukee – Nate Forse 34-yard pass from Chris Greisen (Robert Forstrom kick), 10:51
- Chicago – DeJuan Alfonzo 1-yard run (Chris Gould kick), 8:52
- Chicago – Travis LaTendresse 18-yard pass from J.J. Raterink (Chris Gould kick), 4:28
- Milwaukee – Tyre Young 2-yard run (Robert Forstrom kick), 0:52

4th quarter

- Chicago – Robert Boss 6-yard run (Chris Gould kick), 12:02
- Milwaukee – Damian Harrell 17-yard pass from Chris Greisen (Robert Forstrom kick), 10:20
- Chicago – Syvelle Newton 3-yard pass from J.J. Raterink (Chris Gould kick), 1:59
- Chicago – DeJuan Alfonzo 54-yard interception return (Chris Gould kick), 0:43

Passing

- Milwaukee – Chris Greisen: 24/39, 316 yards, 5 TD, 2 INT
- Chicago – J.J. Raterink: 26/37, 296 yards, 5 TD

Rushing

- Milwaukee – Tyre Young: 3 att, 3 yards, 2 TD
- Chicago – Robert Boss: 5 att, 18 yards, 2 TD

Receiving

- Milwaukee – Anthony Jones: 10 rec, 162 yards, 2 TD
- Chicago – Syvelle Newton: 10 rec, 93 yards, 2 TD

=== Week 13: vs. Spokane Shock ===
Quarter	1	2	3	4	Total
Shock	21	13	21	7	62
Iron	7	14	20	7	48

at Bradley Center, Milwaukee, Wisconsin

- Date: June 26
- Game time: 8:05 pm EDT
- Game attendance: 6,613
- Recap^{[usurped]}

Game information

1st quarter

- Spokane – Raul Vijil 28-yard pass from Kyle Rowley (Taylor Rowan kick), 12:22
- Spokane – Antwan Marsh 2-yard run (Taylor Rowan kick), 10:05
- Milwaukee – Damian Harrell 28-yard pass from Chris Greisen (Robert Forstrom kick), 5:54
- Spokane – Raul Vijil 5-yard pass from Kyle Rowley (Taylor Rowan kick), 1:02

2nd quarter

- Spokane – Antwan Marsh 11-yard interception return (Taylor Rowan kick), 14:20
- Milwaukee – Nate Forse 15-yard pass from Chris Greisen (Robert Forstrom kick), 8:59
- Spokane – Taylor Rowan 15-yard field goal, 6:02
- Milwaukee – Tyre Young 1-yard run (Robert Forstrom kick), 1:48
- Spokane – Taylor Rowan 9-yard field goal, 0:00

3rd quarter

- Milwaukee – Anthony Jones 30-yard pass from Chris Greisen (Robert Forstrom kick), 13:06
- Milwaukee – Nate Forse 11-yard pass from Chris Greisen (Robert Forstrom kick no good), 10:24
- Spokane – Huey Whittaker 21-yard pass from Kyle Rowley (Taylor Rowan kick), 9:08
- Milwaukee – Nate Forse 27-yard pass from Chris Greisen (Robert Forstrom kick), 5:56
- Spokane – Antwan Marsh 3-yard run (Taylor Rowan kick), 3:19
- Spokane – Emery Sammons 0-yard kickoff return (Taylor Rowan kick), 2:32

4th quarter

- Milwaukee – Anthony Jones 30-yard pass from Chris Greisen (Robert Forstrom kick), 14:09
- Spokane – Huey Whittaker 33-yard pass from Kyle Rowley (Taylor Rowan kick), 12:06
- Spokane – Kyle Rowley: 14/24, 195 yards, 4 TD
- Milwaukee – Chris Greisen: 21/42, 256 yards, 6 TD, 2 INT

Rushing

- Spokane – Antwan Marsh: 2 att, 5 yards, 2 TD
- Milwaukee – Tyre Young: 3 att, 10 yards, 1 TD

Receiving

- Spokane – Huey Whittaker: 7 rec, 99 yards, 2 TD
- Milwaukee – Anthony Jones: 5 rec, 95 yards, 2 TD

=== Week 14: at Utah Blaze ===
Quarter	1	2	3	4	Total
Iron	21	27	20	14	82
Blaze	14	21	7	14	56

at Maverik Center, West Valley City, Utah

- Date: July 3
- Game time: 7:00 pm EDT
- Game attendance: 3,537
- Referee: Steve Strimling
- Recap

Game information

1st quarter

- Milwaukee – Tyre Young 1-yard run (Robert Forstrom kick), 7:02
- Utah – Akamu Aki 5-yard pass from Brett Elliott (Ben Scott kick), 4:44
- Milwaukee – Damian Harrell 28-yard pass from Chris Greisen (Robert Forstrom kick), 2:34
- Utah – Wendall Williams 19-yard pass from Brett Elliott (Ben Scott kick), 1:06
- Milwaukee – Antoine Burns 54-yard kickoff return (Robert Forstrom kick), 0:13

2nd quarter

- Milwaukee – Damian Harrell 15-yard pass from Chris Greisen (Robert Forstrom kick), 13:48
- Utah – Aaron Boone 26-yard pass from Brett Elliott (Ben Scott kick), 11:30
- Milwaukee – Damian Harrell 14-yard pass from Chris Greisen (Robert Forstrom kick), 8:26
- Utah – Brett Elliott 1-yard run (Ben Scott kick), 3:18
- Milwaukee – Antoine Burns 5-yard pass from Chris Greisen (Robert Forstrom kick), 1:00
- Utah – Aaron Boone 11-yard pass from Brett Elliott (Ben Scott kick), 0:12
- Milwaukee – Antoine Burns 41-yard pass from Chris Greisen (Chris Greisen pass no good), 0:02

3rd quarter

- Milwaukee – Anthony Jones 11-yard pass from Chris Greisen (Robert Forstrom kick), 10:44
- Milwaukee – Tyre Young 2-yard run (Robert Forstrom kick), 8:40
- Utah – Aaron Boone 4-yard pass from Brett Elliott (Ben Scott kick), 4:27
- Milwaukee – Anthony Jones 46-yard pass from Chris Greisen (Robert Forstrom pass no good), 2:23

4th quarter

- Utah – Aaron LeSue 6-yard pass from Brett Elliott (Ben Scott kick), 14:25
- Milwaukee – Damian Harrell 8-yard pass from Chris Greisen (Robert Forstrom kick), 11:54
- Milwaukee – Anthony Jones 29-yard pass from Chris Crane (Robert Forstrom kick), 1:32
- Utah – Aaron Boone 16-yard pass from Brett Elliott (Ben Scott kick), 0:42

Passing

- Milwaukee – Chris Greisen: 21/23, 330 yards, 8 TD
- Utah – Brett Elliott: 26/38, 264 yards, 7 TD, 2 INT

Rushing

- Milwaukee – Tyre Young: 5 att, 12 yards, 2 TD
- Utah – Damian Walker: 6 att, 10 yards

Receiving

- Milwaukee – Anthony Jones: 7 rec, 144 yards, 3 TD
- Utah – Aaron Boone: 16 rec, 176 yards, 4 TD

=== Week 16: vs. Orlando Predators ===
Quarter	1	2	3	4	Total
Predators	14	6	7	14	41
Iron	6	30	7	14	57

at Bradley Center, Milwaukee, Wisconsin

- Date: July 17
- Game time: 8:00 pm EDT
- Game attendance: 6,948
- Recap

Game information

1st quarter

- Orlando – T.T. Toliver 17-yard pass from Nick Hill (Carlos Martinez kick), 11:54
- Milwaukee – Antoine Burns 43-yard pass from Chris Greisen (Robert Forstrom kick no good), 10:44
- Orlando – Robert Quiroga 4-yard pass from Nick Hill (Carlos Martinez kick), 3:26

2nd quarter

- Milwaukee – Anthony Jones 6-yard run (Robert Forstrom kick), 14:57
- Milwaukee – Damian Harrell 13-yard pass from Chris Greisen (Robert Forstrom kick), 10:57
- Orlando – Robert Quiroga 15-yard pass from Nick Hill (Carlos Martinez kick no good), 7:03
- Milwaukee – Antoine Burns 11-yard pass from Chris Greisen (Robert Forstrom kick), 3:54
- Milwaukee – Safety, 1:57
- Milwaukee – Anthony Jones 20-yard pass from Chris Greisen (Robert Forstrom kick), 0:56

3rd quarter

- Orlando – Bobby Sippio 8-yard pass from Nick Hill (Carlos Martinez kick), 11:33
- Milwaukee – Damian Harrell 27-yard pass from Chris Greisen (Robert Forstrom kick), 9:19

4th quarter

- Orlando – Nick Hill 1-yard run (Carlos Martinez kick), 14:57
- Milwaukee – Damian Harrell 18-yard pass from Chris Greisen (Robert Forstrom kick), 11:25
- Orlando – Rayshawn Kizer 47-yard interception return (Carlos Martinez kick), 2:05
- Milwaukee – Anthony Jones 10-yard pass from Chris Greisen (Robert Forstrom kick), 0:56

Passing

- Orlando – Nick Hill: 26/49, 269 yards, 4 TD, 1 INT
- Milwaukee – Chris Greisen: 20/27, 310 yards, 7 TD, 1 INT

Rushing

- Orlando – Nick Hill: 6 att, 13 yards, 1 TD
- Milwaukee – Chris Greisen: 1 att, 9 yards

Receiving

- Orlando – Robert Quiroga: 10 rec, 88 yards, 2 TD
- Milwaukee – Damian Harrell: 6 rec, 104 yards, 3 TD

With the win, the Iron clinched a playoff berth.

=== Week 17: at Iowa Barnstormers ===
Quarter	1	2	3	4	Total
Iron	21	14	13	27	75
Barnstormers	21	20	6	20	67

at Wells Fargo Arena, Des Moines, Iowa

- Date: July 24
- Game time: 8:05 pm EDT
- Game attendance: 10,190
- Referee: Brad Van Vark

Game information

1st quarter

- Milwaukee – Damian Harrell 17-yard pass from Chris Greisen (Robert Forstrom kick), 13:19
- Iowa – Rodney Filer 1-yard run (Jeff Glas kick), 9:39
- Milwaukee – Damian Harrell 18-yard pass from Chris Greisen (Robert Forstrom kick), 6:36
- Iowa – Jesse Schmidt 38-yard pass from Ryan Vena (Jeff Glas kick), 5:41
- Milwaukee – Anthony Jones 33-yard pass from Chris Greisen (Robert Forstrom kick), 3:06
- Iowa – Ryan Vena 1-yard run (Jeff Glas kick), 0:00

2nd quarter

- Iowa – Tanner Varner 56-yard interception return (Tanner Varner pass no good), 9:42
- Milwaukee – Raymond McNeil 0-yard run (Robert Forstrom kick), 6:53
- Iowa – Errick McCown 5-yard pass from Ryan Vena (Jeff Glas kick), 2:40
- Milwaukee – Tyre Young 2-yard run (Robert Forstrom kick), 0:33
- Iowa – Jesse Schmidt 17-yard pass from Ryan Vena (Jeff Glas kick), 0:08

3rd quarter

- Milwaukee – Anthony Jones 16-yard pass from Chris Greisen (Robert Forstrom kick), 10:59
- Milwaukee – Anthony Jones 2-yard run (Robert Forstrom kick no good), 8:33
- Iowa – Rodney Filer 5-yard run (Jeff Glas kick no good), 1:24

4th quarter

- Milwaukee – Damian Harrell 9-yard pass from Chris Greisen (Robert Forstrom kick), 12:57
- Milwaukee – Antoine Burns 10-yard pass from Chris Greisen (Robert Forstrom kick no good), 6:57
- Iowa – Larry Kendrick 3-yard pass from Ryan Vena (Jeff Glas kick), 2:02
- Milwaukee – Antoine Burns 27-yard pass from Chris Greisen (Robert Forstrom kick), 1:00
- Iowa – Larry Kendrick 11-yard pass from Ryan Vena (Jeff Glas kick), 0:35
- Milwaukee – Damian Harrell 22-yard pass from Chris Greisen (Robert Forstrom kick), 0:22
- Iowa – Errick McCown 9-yard pass from Ryan Vena (Ryan Vena pass no good), 0:00

Passing

- Milwaukee – Chris Greisen: 30/40, 413 yards, 8 TD, 2 INT
- Iowa – Ryan Vena: 28/33, 332 yards, 6 TD, 1 INT

Rushing

- Milwaukee – Anthony Jones: 2 att, 6 yards, 1 TD
- Iowa – Rodney Filer: 4 att, 14 yards, 2 TD

Receiving

- Milwaukee – Damian Harrell: 11 rec, 156 yards, 4 TD
- Iowa – Larry Kendrick: 12 rec, 119 yards, 2 TD

By defeating the Barnstormers and because of a loss by the Chicago Rush in the same week, the Iron clinched the Midwest Division.

=== Week 18: at Cleveland Gladiators ===
Quarter	1	2	3	4	Total
Iron	14	13	7	20	54
Gladiators	6	21	14	6	47

at Quicken Loans Arena, Cleveland Ohio

- Date: July 31
- Game time: 7:00 pm EDT
- Game attendance: 9,423
- Referee: Ron Torbert

Game information

1st quarter

- Milwaukee – Antoine Burns 30-yard pass from Chris Greisen (Robert Forstrom kick), 13:46
- Cleveland – Victor Williams 8-yard pass from John Dutton (Matt Denny kick no good), 10:45
- Milwaukee – Tyre Young 3-yard run (Robert Forstrom kick), 2:21

2nd quarter

- Cleveland – Jermaine Lewis 15-yard pass from John Dutton (Matt Denny kick), 14:21
- Milwaukee – Damian Harrell 10-yard pass from Chris Greisen (Robert Forstrom kick), 12:38
- Cleveland – T.J. Watkins 2-yard pass from John Dutton (Matt Denny kick), 6:09
- Milwaukee – Anthony Jones 10-yard pass from Chris Greisen (Robert Forstrom kick no good), 1:59
- Cleveland – Brent Holmes 9-yard pass from John Dutton (Matt Denny kick), 0:32

3rd quarter

- Cleveland – Victor Williams 2-yard pass from John Dutton (Matt Denny kick), 11:10
- Milwaukee – Anthony Jones 34-yard pass from Chris Greisen (Robert Forstrom kick), 9:42
- Cleveland – Joe Phinisee 45-yard pass from John Dutton (Matt Denny kick), 8:53

4th quarter

- Cleveland – Joe Phinisee 13-yard pass from John Dutton (Matt Denny kick no good), 14:39
- Milwaukee – Anthony Jones 1-yard run (Robert Forstrom pass no good), 6:54
- Milwaukee – Trumaine Sykes 0-yard fumble return (Robert Forstrom kick), 5:26
- Milwaukee – Virgil Gray 12-yard pass from Chris Crane (Robert Forstrom kick), 2:21

Passing

- Milwaukee – Chris Greisen: 14/20, 204 yards, 4 TD
- Cleveland – John Dutton: 26/37, 298 yards, 7 TD, 2 INT

Rushing

- Milwaukee – Chris Crane: 5 att, 14 yards
- Cleveland – Victor Williams: 2 att, 1 yard

Receiving

- Milwaukee – Anthony Jones: 8 rec, 100 yards, 2 TD
- Cleveland – Brent Holmes: 10 rec, 103 yards, 1 TD

== Playoffs ==
=== National Conference semifinals: vs. Chicago Rush ===
Quarter	1	2	3	4	Total
Rush	14	19	7	14	54
Iron	20	24	7	13	64

at Spokane Veterans Memorial Arena, Spokane, Washington

- Date: August 7
- Game time: 8:00 pm EDT
- Game attendance: 5,023
- Recap

Game information

1st quarter

- Milwaukee – Antoine Burns 36-yard pass from Chris Greisen (Robert Forstrom kick), 13:36
- Chicago – DeJuan Alfonzo 30-yard pass from J.J. Raterink (Chris Gould kick), 12:34
- Milwaukee – Antoine Burns 41-yard pass from Chris Greisen (Robert Forstrom kick), 10:51
- Chicago – Syvelle Newton 26-yard pass from J.J. Raterink (Chris Gould kick), 7:03
- Milwaukee – Antoine Burns 5-yard pass from Chris Greisen (Robert Forstrom kick no good), 2:43

2nd quarter

- Chicago – Syvelle Newton 5-yard pass from J.J. Raterink (Chris Gould kick no good), 14:17
- Chicago – Josh Ferguson 50-yard interception return (Chris Gould kick), 11:27
- Milwaukee – Antoine Burns 27-yard pass from Chris Greisen (Robert Forstrom kick), 7:47
- Milwaukee – Damian Harrell 10-yard pass from Chris Greisen (Robert Forstrom kick), 3:35
- Chicago – Syvelle Newton 13-yard pass from J.J. Raterink (Chris Gould kick no good), 1:00
- Milwaukee – Damian Harrell 4-yard pass from Chris Greisen (Robert Forstrom kick), 0:36
- Milwaukee – Robert Forstrom 11-yard field goal, 0:00

3rd quarter

- Milwaukee – Damian Harrell 20-yard pass from Chris Greisen (Robert Forstrom kick), 7:30
- Chicago – Alan Turner 13-yard pass from J.J. Raterink (Chris Gould kick), 3:25

4th quarter

- Milwaukee – Damian Harrell 22-yard pass from Chris Greisen (Robert Forstrom kick), 14:12
- Chicago – Syvelle Newton 25-yard pass from J.J. Raterink (Chris Gould kick), 10:49
- Milwaukee – Damian Harrell 5-yard pass from Chris Greisen (Robert Forstrom kick no good), 7:52
- Chicago – Syvelle Newton 12-yard pass from J.J. Raterink (Chris Gould kick), 4:52

Passing

- Chicago – J.J. Raterink: 25/42, 295 yards, 7 TD, 1 INT
- Milwaukee – Chris Greisen: 26/32, 310 yards, 7 TD, 1 INT

Rushing

- Chicago – J.J. Raterink: 2 att, 13 yards
- Milwaukee – Antoine Burns: 1 att, 15 yards

Receiving

- Chicago – Syvelle Newton: 11 rec, 123 yards, 5 TD
- Milwaukee – Antoine Burns: 9 rec, 135 yards, 4 TD

=== National Conference Championship: at Spokane Shock ===
Quarter	1	2	3	4	Total
Iron	7	16	21	13	57
Shock	23	16	7	14	60

at Spokane Veterans Memorial Arena, Spokane, Washington

- Date: August 12
- Game time: 8:00 pm EDT
- Game attendance: 8,151
- Referee: Shawn Hochuli
- Recap

Game information

1st quarter

- Spokane – Markee White 14-yard pass from Kyle Rowley (Taylor Rowan kick), 11:03
- Milwaukee – Antoine Burns 57-yard kickoff return (Robert Forstrom kick), 10:15
- Spokane – Huey Whittaker 2-yard run (Taylor Rowan kick), 6:30
- Spokane – Safety, 5:37
- Spokane – Huey Whittaker 12-yard pass from Kyle Rowley (Taylor Rowan kick), 2:50

2nd quarter

- Milwaukee – Robert Forstrom 17-yard field goal, 13:24
- Spokane – Ed Ta'amu 6-yard pass from Kyle Rowley (Taylor Rowan kick no good), 10:01
- Milwaukee – Damian Harrell 6-yard pass from Chris Greisen (Robert Forstrom kick), 5:14
- Spokane – Huey Whittaker 4-yard pass from Kyle Rowley (Taylor Rowan kick), 1:27
- Milwaukee – Anthony Jones 5-yard pass from Chris Greisen (Robert Forstrom kick no good)
- Spokane – Taylor Rowan 22-yard field goal

3rd quarter

- Milwaukee – Tyre Young 1-yard run (Robert Forstrom kick), 10:13
- Milwaukee – Richard Ranglin 4-yard pass from Chris Greisen (Robert Forstrom kick), 7:26
- Spokane – Huey Whittaker 15-yard pass from Kyle Rowley (Taylor Rowan kick), 5:52
- Milwaukee – Anthony Jones 7-yard pass from Chris Greisen (Robert Forstrom kick), 0:00

4th quarter

- Spokane – Markee White 5-yard pass from Kyle Rowley (Taylor Rowan kick), 9:44
- Milwaukee – Tyre Young 7-yard pass from Chris Greisen (Damian Harrell pass no good), 7:48
- Spokane – Huey Whittaker 5-yard pass from Kyle Rowley (Taylor Rowan kick), 1:59
- Milwaukee – Tyre Young 1-yard run (Robert Forstrom kick), 0:35

Passing

- Milwaukee – Chris Greisen: 24/31, 235 yards, 5 TD
- Spokane – Kyle Rowley: 28/37, 334 yards, 7 TD

Rushing

- Milwaukee – Tyre Young: 5 att, 6 yards, 2 TD
- Spokane – Huey Whittaker: 2 att, 6 yards, 1 TD

Receiving

- Milwaukee – Antoine Burns: 8 rec, 84 yards
- Spokane – Huey Whittaker: 14 rec, 165 yards, 4 TD
