= 2010 Chicago Rush season =

Arena Football League team season

- Head coach: Mike Hohensee
- Home stadium: Allstate Arena

Results
- Record: 10–6
- Division place: 2nd NC Midwest
- Playoffs: Lost Conference semifinals (Iron) 54–64

The 2010 Chicago Rush season was the tenth season for the franchise in the Arena Football League. The team was coached by Mike Hohensee and played their home games at Allstate Arena. For the 10th consecutive season, the Rush qualified for the playoffs. In the conference semifinals, they lost to the Milwaukee Iron, 54–64.

== Standings ==
Midwest Division
Team	W	L	PCT	PF	PA	DIV	CON	Home	Away
y-Milwaukee Iron	11	5	.687	1043	903	5–1	8–3	7–1	4–4
x-Chicago Rush	10	6	.625	906	873	4–2	8–3	5–3	5–3
Cleveland Gladiators	7	9	.438	938	906	2–4	4–6	4–4	3–5
Iowa Barnstormers	7	9	.438	829	833	1–5	3–7	2–6	5–3

y - Clinched division
x - Clinched playoff berth

== Regular season schedule ==
The Rush opened their season on the road against the Barnstormers on April 2. Their first home game of the season will take place on April 9 as they host the Gladiators. They concluded their regular season in Week 17 visiting the Shock on July 23, one week earlier than the rest of the league, as the Rush had their second of two bye weeks in Week 18.

Week	Day	Date	Kickoff	Opponent	Results		Location	Report
Week	Day	Date	Kickoff	Opponent	Score	Record	Location	Report
1	Friday	April 2	8:05 pm	at Iowa Barnstormers	W 61–43	1–0	Wells Fargo Arena	^{[usurped]}
2	Friday	April 9	8:00 pm	Cleveland Gladiators	W 59–56	2–0	Allstate Arena	^{[usurped]}
3	Friday	April 16	10:30 pm	at Arizona Rattlers	W 70–56	3–0	US Airways Center	^{[usurped]}
4	Friday	April 23	8:00 pm	Utah Blaze	W 63–40	4–0	Allstate Arena	
5	Bye							
6	Friday	May 7	8:30 pm	at Milwaukee Iron	L 48–71	4–1	Bradley Center	
7	Saturday	May 15	8:00 pm	Iowa Barnstormers	L 30–44	4–2	Allstate Arena	
8	Friday	May 21	8:30 pm	at Dallas Vigilantes	W 63–56	5–2	American Airlines Center	
9	Saturday	May 29	7:00 pm	at Cleveland Gladiators	W 52–49	6–2	Quicken Loans Arena	
10	Friday	June 4	8:00 pm	Jacksonville Sharks	L 56–64	6–3	Allstate Arena	
11	Saturday	June 12	9:05 pm	at Utah Blaze	W 70–50	7–3	Maverik Center	
12	Saturday	June 19	8:00 pm	Milwaukee Iron	W 63–56	8–3	Allstate Arena	
13	Saturday	June 26	8:00 pm	Orlando Predators	W 55–42	9–3	Allstate Arena	
14	Friday	July 2	7:30 pm	at Tampa Bay Storm	L 60–68	9–4	St. Pete Times Forum	
15	Saturday	July 10	8:00 pm	Arizona Rattlers	W 55–50	10–4	Allstate Arena	
16	Saturday	July 17	8:00 pm	Dallas Vigilantes	L 52–65 (OT)	10–5	Allstate Arena	
17	Friday	July 23	8:00 pm	at Spokane Shock	L 49–63	10–6	Spokane Veterans Memorial Arena	
18	Bye							

All times are EDT

== Playoff schedule ==
Round	Day	Date	Kickoff	Opponent	Score	Location	Report
NC Semifinals	Saturday	August 7	8:00 pm	at Milwaukee Iron	L 54–64	Bradley Center	

All times are EDT

== Regular season ==
=== Week 1: at Iowa Barnstormers ===
Quarter	1	2	3	4	Total
Rush	17	17	7	20	61
Barnstormers	0	22	0	21	43

at Wells Fargo Arena, Des Moines, Iowa

- Date: April 2
- Game time: 8:05 pm EDT
- Game attendance: 12,184
- Referee: Brad Van Vark
- Recap^{[usurped]}

Game information

1st quarter

- Chicago – DeJuan Alfonzo 9-yard interception return (Chris Gould kick), 9:45
- Chicago – Palauni Ma Sun 5-yard pass from Russ Michna (Chris Gould kick), 4:36
- Chicago – Chris Gould 27-yard field goal, 1:00

2nd quarter

- Iowa – Jesse Schmidt 24-yard pass from Ryan Vena (Jeff Glas kick no good), 13:14
- Iowa – Ryan Vena 1-yard run (Jeff Glas kick no good), 11:07
- Chicago – Kenny Higgins 13-yard pass from Russ Michna (Chris Gould kick), 7:38
- Iowa – Jeff Glas 21-yard field goal, 4:12
- Chicago – Samie Parker 42-yard pass from Russ Michna (Chris Gould kick), 2:58
- Iowa – Todd Blythe 17-yard pass from Ryan Vena (Jeff Glas kick), 0:08
- Chicago – Chris Gould 34-yard field goal (Chris Gould kick), 0:00

3rd quarter

- Chicago – Allen Turner 14-yard pass from Russ Michna (Chris Gould kick), 9:39

4th quarter

- Chicago – Samie Parker 30-yard pass from Russ Michna (Chris Gould kick no good), 12:29
- Iowa – Todd Blythe 5-yard pass from Ryan Vena (Jeff Glas kick), 9:37
- Iowa – Ryan Vena 2-yard run (Todd Blythe pass), 6:00
- Chicago – Kenny Higgins 10-yard pass from Russ Michna (Chris Gould kick), 1:45
- Iowa – Timothy Dodge 6-yard pass from Ryan Vena no good), 0:33
- Chicago – Robert Boss 6-yard run (Chris Gould kick), 0:26

Passing

- Chicago – Russ Michna: 18/28, 261 yards, 6 TD, 1 INT
- Iowa – Ryan Vena: 18/40, 245 yards, 4 TD, 3 INT

Rushing

- Chicago – Robert Boss: 9 att, 6 yards, 1 TD
- Iowa – Ryan Vena: 4 att, 6 yards, 2 TD

Receiving

- Chicago – Samie Parker: 6 rec, 104 yards, 2 TD
- Iowa – Jesse Schmidt: 8 rec, 129 yards, 1 TD

In the league's season opener, the Rush were the first to score when DeJuan Alfonzo intercepted a pass and took it 9 yards back for a touchdown. The Rush held a 17–0 lead after the 1st quarter. The 2nd quarter saw more of the two teams trading scores, but the Rush still led the game at halftime 34–22. The Rush were the only team to score in the 3rd quarter, a 14-yard touchdown pass from Russ Michna to Allen Turner. The Barnstormers were able to cut the Rush's lead to 10 points in the 4th quarter, but Chicago was able to close them out, winning the game by a final score of 61–43.

The Chicago defense forced six turnovers, including four on Iowa's first four possessions of the game. Quarterback Russ Michna threw for 261 yards and 6 touchdowns. Samie Parker led in the receiving department with 104 yards and 2 touchdowns. Josh Ferguson and Nygel Rogers each had two interceptions.

=== Week 2: vs. Cleveland Gladiators ===
Quarter	1	2	3	4	Total
Gladiators	14	14	14	14	56
Rush	14	14	14	17	59

at Allstate Arena, Rosemont, Illinois

- Date: April 9
- Game time: 8:00 pm EDT
- Game attendance: 8,075
- Referee: Tom McCabe
- Recap^{[usurped]}

Game information

1st quarter

- Chicago – Samie Parker 42-yard pass from Russ Michna (Chris Gould kick), 14:03
- Cleveland – Ben Nelson 15-yard pass from John Dutton (Matt Denny kick), 12:15
- Cleveland – Brent Holmes 3-yard pass from John Dutton (Matt Denny kick), 5:23
- Chicago – Nichiren Flowers 29-yard pass from Russ Michna (Chris Gould kick), 2:21

2nd quarter

- Cleveland – Ben Nelson 5-yard pass from John Dutton (Matt Denny kick), 11:08
- Chicago – Samie Parker 6-yard pass from Russ Michna (Chris Gould kick), 5:47
- Cleveland – Chris Johnson 1-yard run (Matt Denny kick), 2:30
- Chicago – Kenny Higgins 4-yard pass from Russ Michna (Chris Gould kick), 1:00

3rd quarter

- Chicago – Robert Boss 18-yard pass from Russ Michna (Chris Gould kick), 9:03
- Cleveland – Brent Holmes 25-yard pass from John Dutton (Matt Denny kick), 6:01
- Cleveland – TJ Watkins 1-yard run (Matt Denny kick), 3:26
- Chicago – Kenny Higgins 16-yard pass from Russ Michna (Chris Gould kick), 0:00

4th quarter

- Chicago – Nichiren Flowers 25-yard pass from Russ Michna (Chris Gould kick), 10:25
- Cleveland – Ben Nelson 5-yard pass from John Dutton (Matt Denny kick), 6:49
- Chicago – Samie Parker 28-yard pass from Russ Michna (Chris Gould kick), 3:30
- Cleveland – Ben Nelson 13-yard pass from John Dutton (Matt Denny kick), 0:45
- Chicago – Chris Gould 12-yard field goal, 0:02

Passing

- Cleveland – John Dutton: 37/52, 379 yards, 6 TD, 3 INT
- Chicago – Russ Michna: 22/27, 315 yards, 8 TD

Rushing

- Cleveland – Brent Holmes: 1 att, 6 yards
- Chicago – Russ Michna: 3 att, 13 yards

Receiving

- Cleveland – Ben Nelson: 12 rec, 133 yards, 4 TD
- Chicago – Samie Parker: 9 rec, 148 yards, 3 TD

The entire game was closely contended, with the score tied at the end of each of the first three quarters, and neither team led by more than a touchdown all night. With 45 seconds left, and the game tied 56–56, quarterback Russ Michna led the Rush on a 7-play, 33-yard drive that ended with a 12-yard field goal by Chris Gould to take the lead with two seconds in the game. After a touchback following the ensuing kickoff, the Gladiators completed a pass, but failed to even get the ball past midfield, ending the game. Michna finished with 315 passing yards, completing 22 of 27 passes with 8 touchdowns.

=== Week 3: at Arizona Rattlers ===
Quarter	1	2	3	4	Total
Rush	14	28	14	14	70
Rattlers	14	21	7	14	56

at US Airways Center, Phoenix, Arizona

- Date: April 16
- Game time: 10:30 pm EDT
- Game attendance: 14,994
- Referee: Steve Kovac
- Recap^{[usurped]}

=== Week 4: vs. Utah Blaze ===
Quarter	1	2	3	4	Total
Blaze	7	7	13	13	40
Rush	14	14	14	21	63

at Allstate Arena, Rosemont, Illinois

- Date: April 23
- Game time: 8:00 pm EDT
- Game attendance: 7,459
- Referee: Tom McCabe
- Recap

Game information

1st quarter

- Utah – Aaron Boone 4-yard pass from Brett Elliott (Ben Scott kick), 10:46
- Chicago – Samie Parker 34-yard pass from Russ Michna (Chris Gould kick), 9:29
- Chicago – Clifton Smith 1-yard run (Chris Gould kick), 0:00

2nd quarter

- Chicago – Nichiren Flowers 29-yard pass from Russ Michna (Chris Gould kick), 8:10
- Utah – Chris Francies 25-yard pass from Brett Elliott (Ben Scott kick), 0:16
- Chicago – Allen Turner 24-yard pass from Russ Michna (Chris Gould kick), 0:04

3rd quarter

- Chicago – Allen Turner 3-yard run (Chris Gould kick), 11:45
- Utah – Aaron Boone 10-yard pass from Brett Elliott (Ben Scott kick no good), 10:43
- Chicago – Nichiren Flowers 5-yard pass from Russ Michna (Chris Gould kick), 5:27
- Utah – Chris Francies 24-yard pass from Brett Elliott (Ben Scott kick), 3:08

4th quarter

- Chicago – Allen Turner 13-yard pass from Russ Michna (Chris Gould kick), 14:13
- Utah – Aaron Boone 2-yard pass from Brett Elliott (Aaron Boone pass no good), 7:45
- Chicago – Nichiren Flowers 34-yard pass from Russ Michna (Chris Gould kick), 4:28
- Utah – Tyler Clutts 2-yard run (Ben Scott kick), 0:55
- Chicago – Russ Michna 4-yard run (Chris Gould kick), 0:06

Passing

- Utah – Brett Elliott: 31/44, 316 yards, 5 TD, 1 INT
- Chicago – Russ Michna: 21/30, 326 yards, 6 TD

Rushing

- Utah – Tyler Clutts: 2 att, 2 yards, 1 TD
- Chicago – Samie Parker: 1 att, 6 yards

Receiving

- Utah – Chris Francies: 12 rec, 155 yards, 2 TD
- Chicago – Nichiren Flowers: 9 rec, 129 yards, 3 TD

The Rush improved to 4–0 by defeating the winless Blaze at home. Utah took the ball first and scored a touchdown, but it was the only time they would lead in the game. On their first play from scrimmage, the Rush found the end zone on a 34-yard passing touchdown. When Utah got the ball again, the Rush's Clifton Smith blocked a field goal attempt, and then scored a touchdown on a 1-yard run on Chicago's ensuing drive. At halftime, the Rush led 28–14. They received the ball to begin the 3rd quarter and marched up the field for a touchdown, scored on a 3-yard running play. Chicago attempted an onside kick following this score, but it went out of bounds, putting the Blaze 10 yards away from the end zone. Utah only needed one play to score another touchdown and cut their deficit to 35–20, but the Rush did not allow the game to get any closer the rest of the night, winning 63–40.

Russ Michna threw for 330 yards, a season high, and 7 total touchdowns. For the second consecutive week, Nichiren Flowers was the leading receiver with 129 yards and 3 touchdowns. Chicago held Utah to 40 points, a season-best for the Rush, and the defense stopped three fourth-down attempts by the Blaze offense.

=== Week 6: at Milwaukee Iron ===
Quarter	1	2	3	4	Total
Rush	20	7	7	14	48
Iron	7	20	34	10	71

at Bradley Center, Milwaukee, Wisconsin

- Date: May 7
- Game time: 8:30 pm EDT
- Game attendance: 5,386
- Recap

Game information

1st quarter

- Chicago – Kenny Higgins 26-yard pass from Russ Michna (Chris Gould kick blocked), 10:26
- Milwaukee – Nate Forse 38-yard pass from Chris Greisen (Robert Forstrom kick), 9:10
- Chicago – Shawn McMackin 31-yard pass from Nichiren Flowers (Chris Gould kick), 6:45
- Chicago – Kenny Higgins 29-yard pass from Russ Michna (Chris Gould kick), 0:00

2nd quarter

- Milwaukee – Anthony Jones 28-yard pass from Chris Greisen (Robert Forstrom kick), 12:45
- Milwaukee – Tyre Young 6-yard run (Robert Forstrom kick blocked), 10:46
- Chicago – Russ Michna 4-yard run (Chris Gould kick), 7:11
- Milwaukee – Tyre Young 2-yard run (Robert Forstrom kick), 1:43

3rd quarter

- Milwaukee – Alvance Robinson 38-yard pass from Chris Greisen (Robert Forstrom kick), 13:46
- Milwaukee – Marcus Everett 9-yard interception return (Robert Forstrom kick), 9:44
- Milwaukee – Nate Forse 0-yard fumble return (Robert Forstrom kick), 7:36
- Milwaukee – Marcus Everett 46-yard interception return (Robert Forstrom kick no good), 5:26
- Chicago – Robert Boss 18-yard pass from Russ Michna (Chris Gould kick), 4:28
- Milwaukee – Nate Forse 20-yard pass from Chris Greisen (Robert Forstrom kick), 0:00

4th quarter

- Chicago – Samie Parker 32-yard pass from Russ Michna (Chris Gould kick), 13:32
- Milwaukee – Nate Forse 26-yard pass from Chris Greisen (Robert Forstrom kick), 9:48
- Milwaukee – Robert Forstrom 25-yard field goal, 2:19
- Chicago – Russ Michna 4-yard run (Chris Gould kick), 0:11

Passing

- Chicago – Russ Michna: 21/33, 354 yards, 4 TD, 2 INT
- Milwaukee – Chris Greisen: 26/30, 339 yards, 5 TD

Rushing

- Chicago – Russ Michna: 4 att, 4 yards, 2 TD
- Milwaukee – Tyre Young: 5 att, 14 yards, 2 TD

Receiving

- Chicago – Kenny Higgins: 9 rec, 157 yards, 2 TD
- Milwaukee – Nate Forse: 10 rec, 171 yards, 3 TD

At halftime, the game was tied at 27–27, but the Rush allowed 34 points in the 3rd quarter alone, a deficit that proved to large to overcome, resulting in the first loss of the season for Chicago. After giving up a touchdown to Milwaukee on the opening drive of the 3rd quarter, the Rush turned the ball over on four consecutive possessions. Two of those giveaways were passes by Russ Michna that were intercepted and returned for touchdowns, while another was a fumble recovered by the Iron in the end zone. At the start of the 4th quarter, the Rush were in a 61–34 hole. Losing by a final score of 71–48, it was the most points the Rush had given up in a single game since 2004. The team's 6 turnovers tied a franchise record set in 2001. Michna's 354 passing yards surpassed the season-high he had totaled in the previous week, and had six touchdowns in the game, four in the air and two on the ground. Kenny Higgins had 157 yards and 2 touchdowns on 9 catches, leading all receivers.

=== Week 7: vs. Iowa Barnstormers ===
Quarter	1	2	3	4	Total
Barnstormers	7	17	14	6	44
Rush	0	16	7	7	30

at Allstate Arena, Rosemont, Illinois

- Date: May 15
- Game time: 8:00 pm EDT
- Game attendance: 10,363
- Referee: Tom McCabe
- Recap

=== Week 8: at Dallas Vigilantes ===
Quarter	1	2	3	4	Total
Rush	21	20	7	15	63
Vigilantes	14	21	7	14	56

at American Airlines Center, Dallas, Texas

- Date: May 21
- Game time: 8:30 pm EDT
- Game attendance: 4,583
- Referee: Mark Windham
- Recap

=== Week 9: at Cleveland Gladiators ===
Quarter	1	2	3	4	Total
Rush	7	14	9	22	52
Gladiators	14	14	7	14	49

at Quicken Loans Arena, Cleveland, Ohio

- Date: May 29
- Game time: 7:00 pm EDT
- Game attendance: 8,688
- Referee: Ron Torbet
- Recap

Game information

1st quarter

- Cleveland – Brent Holmes 6-yard pass from John Dutton (Matt Denny kick), 10:06
- Chicago – Robert Boss 4-yard run (Chris Gould kick), 4:09
- Cleveland – Brent Holmes 32-yard pass from John Dutton (Matt Denny kick), 1:38

2nd quarter

- Chicago – Samie Parker 14-yard pass from Russ Michna (Chris Gould kick), 12:59
- Cleveland – Russell Monk 3-yard pass from John Dutton (Matt Denny kick), 9:48
- Cleveland – Ben Nelson 30-yard pass from John Dutton (Matt Denny kick), 1:51
- Chicago – DeJuan Alfonzo 1-yard run (Chris Gould kick), 0:02

3rd quarter

- Chicago – Nichiren Flowers 24-yard pass from Russ Michna (Chris Gould kick no good), 13:38
- Cleveland – Terrell Browden 1-yard run (Matt Denny kick), 7:58
- Chicago – Chris Gould 16-yard field goal, 4:06

4th quarter

- Chicago – Samie Parker 27-yard pass from Russ Michna (Russ Michna run no good), 13:56
- Cleveland – Russell Monk 2-yard run (Matt Denny kick), 7:52
- Chicago – Allen Turner 22-yard pass from Russ Michna (Chris Gould kick no good), 6:23
- Chicago – Chris Gould 26-yard field goal, 0:39
- Cleveland – Ben Nelson 20-yard pass from John Dutton (Matt Denny kick), 0:22
- Chicago – Chris Martin 57-yard kickoff return (Chris Gould kick), 0:14

Passing

- Chicago – Russ Michna: 22/29, 272 yards, 4 TD
- Cleveland – John Dutton: 28/39, 351 yards, 5 TD, 1 INT

Rushing

- Chicago – Robert Boss: 4 att, 19 yards, 1 TD
- Cleveland – Russell Monk: 3 att, 6 yards, 1 TD

Receiving

- Chicago – Samie Parker: 8 rec, 114 yards, 2 TD
- Cleveland – Steve Sanders: 14 rec, 173 yards

=== Week 10: vs. Jacksonville Sharks ===
Quarter	1	2	3	4	Total
Sharks	20	12	20	12	64
Rush	14	14	21	7	56

at Allstate Arena, Rosemont, Illinois

- Date: June 4
- Game time: 8:00 pm EDT
- Game attendance: 7,430
- Referee: Tom McCabe
- Recap

Game information

1st quarter

- Jacksonville – Irving Campbell 50-yard kickoff return (Paul Edinger kick), 14:01
- Chicago – Allen Turner 13-yard pass from Russ Michna (Chris Gould kick), 10:29
- Jacksonville – Dallas Baker 17-yard pass from Aaron Garcia (Paul Edinger kick), 8:37
- Chicago – Russ Michna 1-yard run (Chris Gould kick), 2:22
- Jacksonville – Jomo Wilson 57-yard kickoff return (Paul Edinger kick no good), 1:18

2nd quarter

- Chicago – Robert Boss 7-yard pass from Russ Michna (Chris Gould kick), 9:23
- Chicago – Chris Martin 31-yard interception return (Chris Gould kick), 5:38
- Jacksonville – Dallas Baker 7-yard pass from Aaron Garcia (Paul Edinger kick), 0:55
- Jacksonville – Safety, 0:46
- Jacksonville – Paul Edinger 17-yard field goal, 0:03

3rd quarter

- Jacksonville – Jason Willis 24-yard pass from Aaron Garcia (Paul Edinger kick), 12:21
- Chicago – Samie Parker 30-yard pass from Russ Michna (Chris Gould kick), 11:14
- Jacksonville – Jomo Wilson 43-yard pass from Aaron Garcia (Paul Edinger kick no good), 9:05
- Chicago – Allen Turner 7-yard pass from Russ Michna (Chris Gould kick), 5:17
- Jacksonville – Dallas Baker 48-yard pass from Aaron Garcia (Paul Edinger kick), 2:44
- Chicago – Samie Parker 23-yard pass from Russ Michna (Chris Gould kick), 0:00

4th quarter

- Jacksonville – Dallas Baker 7-yard pass from Aaron Garcia (Paul Edinger kick no good), 10:20
- Jacksonville – Dallas Baker 19-yard pass from Aaron Garcia (Paul Edinger kick no good), 7:21
- Chicago – Robert Boss 10-yard run (Chris Gould kick), 4:57

Passing

- Jacksonville – Aaron Garcia: 25/37, 304 yards, 7 TD, 2 INT
- Chicago – Russ Michna: 22/31, 292 yards, 5 TD

Rushing

- Jacksonville – Kirby Griffin: 4 att, 21 yards
- Chicago – Robert Boss: 3 att, 14 yards, 1 TD

Receiving

- Jacksonville – Dallas Baker: 11 rec, 150 yards, 5 TD
- Chicago – DeJuan Alfonzo: 10 rec, 124 yards

=== Week 11: at Utah Blaze ===
Quarter	1	2	3	4	Total
Rush	14	28	21	7	70
Blaze	14	6	10	20	50

at Maverik Center, West Valley City, Utah

- Date: June 12
- Game time: 9:05 pm EDT
- Game attendance: 4,892
- Referee: Steve Strimling
- Recap

Game information

1st quarter

- Utah – Mark Thorson 1-yard run (Ben Scott kick), 9:14
- Chicago – Travis LaTendresse 12-yard pass from Russ Michna (Chris Gould kick), 7:27
- Utah – Aaron Boone 12-yard pass from Mark Thorson (Ben Scott kick), 4:03
- Chicago – Travis LaTendresse 20-yard pass from Russ Michna (Chris Gould kick), 0:59

2nd quarter

- Chicago – Allen Turner 3-yard pass from Russ Michna (Chris Gould kick), 12:19
- Chicago – Samie Parker 17-yard pass from Russ Michna (Chris Gould kick), 9:56
- Utah – Damian Walker 5-yard run (Ben Scott kick no good), 4:42
- Chicago – Robert Boss 4-yard run (Chris Gould kick), 2:00
- Chicago – Josh Ferguson 38-yard interception return (Chris Gould kick), 0:08

3rd quarter

- Utah – Aaron LeSue 0-yard kickoff return (Ben Scott kick), 14:40
- Chicago – Travis LaTendresse 11-yard pass from Russ Michna (Chris Gould kick), 11:11
- Utah – Ben Scott 33-yard field goal, 7:54
- Chicago – Samie Parker 49-yard pass from Russ Michna (Chris Gould kick), 5:09
- Chicago – Mark Weivoda 2-yard fumble return (Chris Gould kick), 3:46

4th quarter

- Utah – Aaron LeSue 7-yard pass from Taylor Tharp (Ben Scott kick), 14:22
- Utah – Aaron Boone 7-yard pass from Taylor Tharp (Ben Scott kick), 8:26
- Chicago – J.J. Raterink 1-yard run (Chris Gould kick), 4:37
- Utah – Taylor Tharp 2-yard run (Ben Scott kick no good), 1:26

Passing

- Chicago – Russ Michna: 16/19, 217 yards, 6 TD
- Utah – Mark Thorson: 13/20, 142 yards, 1 TD, 1 INT

Rushing

- Chicago – Robert Boss: 6 att, 9 yards, 1 TD
- Utah – Damian Walker: 5 att, 21 yards, 1 TD

Receiving

- Chicago – Samie Parker: 9 rec, 117 yards, 2 TD
- Utah – Aaron Boone: 9 rec, 103 yards, 2 TD

=== Week 12: vs. Milwaukee Iron ===
Quarter	1	2	3	4	Total
Iron	14	21	14	7	56
Rush	7	14	21	21	63

at Allstate Arena, Rosemont, Illinois

- Date: June 19
- Game time: 8:00 pm EDT
- Game attendance: 8,287
- Referee: Tom McCabe
- Recap

Game information

1st quarter

- Milwaukee – Anthony Jones 32-yard pass from Chris Greisen (Robert Forstrom kick), 13:15
- Milwaukee – Tyre Young 2-yard run (Robert Forstrom kick), 3:23
- Chicago – Travis LaTendresse 15-yard pass from J.J. Raterink (Chris Gould kick), 0:58

2nd quarter

- Milwaukee – Damian Harrell 3-yard pass from Chris Greisen (Robert Forstrom kick), 10:33
- Milwaukee – Perry Kyles 4-yard fumble return (Robert Forstrom kick), 5:46
- Chicago – Travis LaTendresse 26-yard pass from J.J. Raterink (Chris Gould kick), 3:16
- Milwaukee – Anthony Jones 34-yard pass from Chris Greisen (Robert Forstrom kick), 1:07
- Chicago – Syvelle Newton 21-yard pass from J.J. Raterink (Chris Gould kick), 0:20

3rd quarter

- Chicago – Robert Boss 2-yard run (Chris Gould kick), 12:21
- Milwaukee – Nate Forse 34-yard pass from Chris Greisen (Robert Forstrom kick), 10:51
- Chicago – DeJuan Alfonzo 1-yard run (Chris Gould kick), 8:52
- Chicago – Travis LaTendresse 18-yard pass from J.J. Raterink (Chris Gould kick), 4:28
- Milwaukee – Tyre Young 2-yard run (Robert Forstrom kick), 0:52

4th quarter

- Chicago – Robert Boss 6-yard run (Chris Gould kick), 12:02
- Milwaukee – Damian Harrell 17-yard pass from Chris Greisen (Robert Forstrom kick), 10:20
- Chicago – Syvelle Newton 3-yard pass from J.J. Raterink (Chris Gould kick), 1:59
- Chicago – DeJuan Alfonzo 54-yard interception return (Chris Gould kick), 0:43

Passing

- Milwaukee – Chris Greisen: 24/39, 316 yards, 5 TD, 2 INT
- Chicago – J.J. Raterink: 26/37, 296 yards, 5 TD

Rushing

- Milwaukee – Tyre Young: 3 att, 3 yards, 2 TD
- Chicago – Robert Boss: 5 att, 18 yards, 2 TD

Receiving

- Milwaukee – Anthony Jones: 10 rec, 162 yards, 2 TD
- Chicago – Syvelle Newton: 10 rec, 93 yards, 2 TD

=== Week 13: vs. Orlando Predators ===
Quarter	1	2	3	4	Total
Predators	7	21	7	7	42
Rush	16	10	17	12	55

at Allstate Arena, Rosemont, Illinois

- Date: June 26
- Game time: 8:00 pm EDT
- Game attendance: 8,120
- Referee: Bob McElwee
- Recap

Game information

1st quarter

- Orlando – Robert Quiroga 11-yard pass from Nick Hill (Carlos Martinez kick), 12:32
- Chicago – Robert Boss 21-yard pass from Russ Michna (Chris Gould kick), 10:33
- Chicago – Safety, 9:51
- Chicago – Robert Boss 24-yard pass from Russ Michna (Chris Gould kick), 5:33

2nd quarter

- Orlando – Robert Quiroga 11-yard pass from Nick Hill (Carlos Martinez kick), 14:13
- Chicago – Robert Boss 6-yard run (Chris Gould kick), 10:18
- Orlando – T.T. Toliver 27-yard pass from Nick Hill (Carlos Martinez kick), 5:50
- Orlando – T.T. Toliver 14-yard pass from Nick Hill (Carlos Martinez kick), 0:35
- Chicago – Chris Gould 23-yard field goal, 0:00

3rd quarter

- Chicago – Travis LaTendresse 6-yard pass from Russ Michna (Chris Gould kick), 11:05
- Orlando – T.T. Toliver 2-yard pass from Nick Hill (Carlos Martinez kick), 7:34
- Chicago – Chris Gould 13-yard field goal, 3:36
- Chicago – Russ Michna 3-yard run (Chris Gould kick), 0:32

4th quarter

- Orlando – Nick Hill 1-yard run (Carlos Martinez kick), 13:40
- Chicago – Samie Parker 15-yard pass from Russ Michna (Chris Gould kick), 4:33
- Chicago – Chris Gould 10-yard field goal, 0:29

Passing

- Orlando – Nick Hill: 19/27, 246 yards, 5 TD, 2 INT
- Chicago – Russ Michna: 22/35, 231 yards, 4 TD, 1 INT

Rushing

- Orlando – James Lynch: 4 att, 32 yards
- Chicago – Russ Michna: 7 att, 21 yards, 1 TD

Receiving

- Orlando – Robert Quiroga: 8 rec, 90 yards, 2 TD
- Chicago – Samie Parker: 9 rec, 97 yards, 1 TD

=== Week 14: at Tampa Bay Storm ===
Quarter	1	2	3	4	Total
Rush	13	21	7	19	60
Storm	14	21	14	19	68

at St. Pete Times Forum, Tampa, Florida

- Date: July 2
- Game time: 8:00 pm EDT
- Game attendance: 15,704
- Referee: Kevin Stine
- Recap

Game information

1st quarter

- Chicago – Allen Turner 42-yard pass from Russ Michna (Chris Gould kick), 13:39
- Tampa Bay – Hank Edwards 30-yard pass from Brett Dietz (Garrett Rivas kick), 11:20
- Chicago – Allen Turner 10-yard pass from Russ Michna (Chris Gould kick no good), 8:11
- Tampa Bay – Hank Edwards 8-yard pass from Brett Dietz (Garrett Rivas kick), 4:17

2nd quarter

- Chicago – Allen Turner 4-yard pass from Russ Michna (Chris Gould kick), 12:51
- Tampa Bay – Sedrick Robinson 6-yard pass from Brett Dietz (Garrett Rivas kick), 8:13
- Chicago – Palauni Ma Sun 10-yard pass from Russ Michna (Chris Gould kick), 3:53
- Tampa Bay – Tyrone Timmons 23-yard pass from Brett Dietz (Garrett Rivas kick), 1:18
- Chicago – Clifton Smith 3-yard run (Chris Gould kick), 0:34
- Tampa Bay – Terrence Royal 1-yard run (Garrett Rivas kick), 0:07

3rd quarter

- Tampa Bay – Hank Edwards 45-yard pass from Brett Dietz (Garrett Rivas kick), 13:47
- Chicago – Marco Thomas 13-yard pass from Russ Michna (Chris Gould kick), 9:46
- Tampa Bay – Hank Edwards 15-yard pass from Brett Dietz (Garrett Rivas kick), 4:22

4th quarter

- Chicago – Syvelle Newton 4-yard pass from Russ Michna (Chris Gould kick no good), 14:14
- Tampa Bay – Tyrone Timmons 5-yard pass from Brett Dietz (Garrett Rivas kick no good), 11:07
- Chicago – Clifton Smith 2-yard run (DeJuan Alfonzo no good), 3:38
- Tampa Bay – Tyrone Timmons 6-yard pass from Brett Dietz (Garrett Rivas kick), 2:42
- Tampa Bay – Erick McIntosh 30-yard fumble return (Garrett Rivas kick no good), 0:46
- Chicago – Allen Turner 4-yard pass from Russ Michna (Chris Gould kick), 0:01

Passing

- Chicago – Russ Michna: 26/38, 334 yards, 7 TD
- Tampa Bay – Brett Dietz: 24/31, 359 yards, 8 TD

Rushing

- Chicago – Russ Michna: 5 att, 23 yards
- Tampa Bay – Terrence Royal: 1 att, 1 yard, 1 TD

Receiving

- Chicago – Marco Thomas: 12 rec, 176 yards, 1 TD
- Tampa Bay – Hank Edwards: 8 rec, 172 yards, 4 TD

=== Week 15: vs. Arizona Rattlers ===
Quarter	1	2	3	4	Total
Rattlers	7	21	7	15	50
Rush	21	21	10	3	55

at Allstate Arena, Rosemont, Illinois

- Date: July 10
- Game time: 8:00 pm EDT
- Game attendance: 8,452
- Referee: Tom McCabe
- Recap

Game information

1st quarter

- Chicago – Syvelle Newton 27-yard pass from Russ Michna (Chris Gould kick), 12:38
- Arizona – Rod Windsor 3-yard run (Fabrizio Scaccia kick), 8:28
- Chicago – Marco Thomas 18-yard pass from Russ Michna (Chris Gould kick), 3:46
- Chicago – Chris Martin 12-yard interception return (Chris Gould kick), 2:28

2nd quarter

- Arizona – Trandon Harvey 29-yard pass from Nick Davila (Fabrizio Scaccia kick), 14:16
- Chicago – Clifton Smith 2-yard run (Chris Gould kick), 7:49
- Arizona – J.J. McKelvey 3-yard pass from Rod Windsor (Fabrizio Scaccia kick), 5:21
- Chicago – Syvelle Newton 7-yard pass from Russ Michna (Chris Gould kick), 1:00
- Arizona – Trandon Harvey 15-yard pass from Nick Davila (Fabrizio Scaccia kick), 0:40
- Chicago – Syvelle Newton 39-yard pass from Russ Michna (Chris Gould kick), 0:06

3rd quarter

- Arizona – J.J. McKelvey 6-yard pass from Nick Davila (Fabrizio Scaccia kick), 10:41
- Chicago – Chris Gould 18-yard field goal
- Chicago – Syvelle Newton 21-yard pass from Russ Michna (Chris Gould kick), 0:00

4th quarter

- Arizona – Rod Windsor 9-yard pass from Nick Davila (Fabrizio Scaccia kick), 10:01
- Chicago – Chris Gould 14-yard field goal, 7:41
- Arizona – Rod Windsor 28-yard pass from Nick Davila (Rod Windsor pass), 0:26

Passing

- Arizona – Nick Davila: 27/48, 343 yards, 5 TD, 3 INT
- Chicago – Russ Michna: 28/38, 321 yards, 5 TD, 1 INT

Rushing

- Arizona – Rod Windsor: 1 att, 3 yards, 1 TD
- Chicago – Syvelle Newton: 2 att, 10 yards

Receiving

- Arizona – Rod Windsor: 15 rec, 179 yards, 2 TD
- Chicago – Marco Thomas: 13 rec, 147 yards, 1 TD

After a close win against Arizona, the Rush clinched a playoff berth.

=== Week 16: vs. Dallas Vigilantes ===
Quarter	1	2	3	4	OT	Total
Vigilantes	14	14	7	17	13	65
Rush	0	23	14	15	0	52

at Allstate Arena, Rosemont, Illinois

- Date: July 17
- Game time: 8:00 pm EDT
- Game attendance: 7,594
- Referee: Tom McCabe
- Recap

Game information

1st quarter

- Dallas – Kenny Henderson 24-yard pass from Collin Drafts (Mark Lewis kick), 13:04
- Dallas – Matt Fields 20-yard pass from Collin Drafts (Mark Lewis kick), 3:37

2nd quarter

- Chicago – Syvelle Newton 9-yard pass from Russ Michna (Chris Gould kick), 13:24
- Dallas – Kenny Henderson 9-yard pass from Collin Drafts (Mark Lewis kick), 9:36
- Chicago – DeJuan Alfonzo 4-yard pass from Russ Michna (Chris Gould kick), 6:33
- Dallas – Collin Drafts 2-yard run (Mark Lewis kick), 1:00
- Chicago – DeJuan Alfonzo 13-yard run (Chris Gould kick), 0:43
- Chicago – Safety, 0:38

3rd quarter

- Chicago – Palauni Ma Sun 7-yard pass from J.J. Raterink (Chris Gould kick), 11:41
- Chicago – Syvelle Newton 10-yard pass from J.J. Raterink (Chris Gould kick), 4:15
- Dallas – Larry Brackins 4-yard pass from Collin Drafts (Mark Lewis kick), 0:00

4th quarter

- Chicago – DeJuan Alfonzo 6-yard pass from J.J. Raterink (Chris Gould kick), 11:01
- Dallas – Larry Brackins 14-yard pass from Collin Drafts (Mark Lewis kick), 4:24
- Dallas – Jason Harmon 2-yard fumble return, 4:24
- Chicago – J.J. Raterink 1-yard run (DeJuan Alfonzo run), 0:41
- Dallas – Mark Lewis 19-yard field goal, 0:00

Overtime

- Dallas – Larry Brackins 4-yard pass from Collin Drafts (Mark Lewis kick), 10:02
- Dallas – Delenall Reid 50-yard interception return

Passing

- Dallas – Collin Drafts: 30/45, 302 yards, 6 TD
- Chicago – J.J. Raterink: 13/19, 156 yards, 3 TD, 1 INT

Rushing

- Dallas – Collin Drafts: 3 att, 11 yards, 1 TD
- Chicago – DeJuan Alfonzo: 2 att, 16 yards, 1 TD

Receiving

- Dallas – Kenny Henderson: 10 rec, 110 yards, 2 TD
- Chicago – Syvelle Newton: 11 rec, 151 yards, 1 TD

=== Week 17: at Spokane Shock ===
Quarter	1	2	3	4	Total
Rush	14	21	14	0	49
Shock	21	21	7	14	63

at Spokane Veterans Memorial Arena, Spokane, Washington

- Date: July 23
- Game time: 8:00 pm EDT
- Game attendance: 10,775
- Referee: Shane Anderson
- Recap

Game information

1st quarter

- Spokane – Ed Ta'amu 12-yard pass from Kyle Rowley (Taylor Rowan kick), 9:43
- Chicago – Syvelle Newton 35-yard pass from J.J. Raterink (Chris Gould kick), 8:03
- Spokane – Mervin Brookins 56-yard kickoff return (Taylor Rowan kick), 7:18
- Chicago – Nichiren Flowers 24-yard pass from J.J. Raterink (Chris Gould kick), 5:04
- Spokane – Shaun Kauleinamoku 16-yard pass from Kyle Rowley (Taylor Rowan kick), 3:09

2nd quarter

- Chicago – Syvelle Newton 11-yard pass from J.J. Raterink (Chris Gould kick), 14:23
- Spokane – Huey Whittaker 33-yard pass from Kyle Rowley (Taylor Rowan kick), 9:22
- Chicago – Allen Turner 9-yard run (Chris Gould kick), 6:28
- Spokane – Huey Whittaker 17-yard pass from Kyle Rowley (Taylor Rowan kick), 1:13
- Chicago – Nichiren Flowers 4-yard pass from J.J. Raterink (Chris Gould kick), 0:16
- Spokane – Markee White 19-yard pass from Kyle Rowley (Taylor Rowan kick), 0:08

3rd quarter

- Chicago – Syvelle Newton 22-yard pass from J.J. Raterink (Chris Gould kick), 9:52
- Spokane – Clay Harrell 1-yard run (Taylor Rowan kick), 6:38
- Chicago – Palauni Ma Sun 4-yard pass from J.J. Raterink (Chris Gould kick), 0:15

4th quarter

- Spokane – Huey Whittaker 5-yard pass from Kyle Rowley (Taylor Rowan kick), 11:00
- Spokane – Greg Orton 16-yard pass from Kyle Rowley (Taylor Rowan kick), 0:56

Passing

- Chicago – J.J. Raterink: 24/41, 294 yards, 6 TD, 1 INT
- Spokane – Kyle Rowley: 24/31, 323 yards, 7 TD

Rushing

- Chicago – Allen Turner: 2 att, 14 yards, 1 TD
- Spokane – Clay Harrell: 1 att, 1 yard, 1 TD

Receiving

- Chicago – Syvelle Newton: 8 rec, 139 yards, 3 TD
- Spokane – Markee White: 9 rec, 114 yards, 1 TD

== Playoffs ==
=== National Conference semifinals: at Milwaukee Iron ===
Quarter	1	2	3	4	Total
Rush	14	19	7	14	54
Iron	20	24	7	13	64

at Spokane Veterans Memorial Arena, Spokane, Washington

- Date: August 7
- Game time: 8:00 pm EDT
- Game attendance: 5,023
- Recap

Game information

1st quarter

- Milwaukee – Antoine Burns 36-yard pass from Chris Greisen (Robert Forstrom kick), 13:36
- Chicago – DeJuan Alfonzo 30-yard pass from J.J. Raterink (Chris Gould kick), 12:34
- Milwaukee – Antoine Burns 41-yard pass from Chris Greisen (Robert Forstrom kick), 10:51
- Chicago – Syvelle Newton 26-yard pass from J.J. Raterink (Chris Gould kick), 7:03
- Milwaukee – Antoine Burns 5-yard pass from Chris Greisen (Robert Forstrom kick no good), 2:43

2nd quarter

- Chicago – Syvelle Newton 5-yard pass from J.J. Raterink (Chris Gould kick no good), 14:17
- Chicago – Josh Ferguson 50-yard interception return (Chris Gould kick), 11:27
- Milwaukee – Antoine Burns 27-yard pass from Chris Greisen (Robert Forstrom kick), 7:47
- Milwaukee – Damian Harrell 10-yard pass from Chris Greisen (Robert Forstrom kick), 3:35
- Chicago – Syvelle Newton 13-yard pass from J.J. Raterink (Chris Gould kick no good), 1:00
- Milwaukee – Damian Harrell 4-yard pass from Chris Greisen (Robert Forstrom kick), 0:36
- Milwaukee – Robert Forstrom 11-yard field goal, 0:00

3rd quarter

- Milwaukee – Damian Harrell 20-yard pass from Chris Greisen (Robert Forstrom kick), 7:30
- Chicago – Alan Turner 13-yard pass from J.J. Raterink (Chris Gould kick), 3:25

4th quarter

- Milwaukee – Damian Harrell 22-yard pass from Chris Greisen (Robert Forstrom kick), 14:12
- Chicago – Syvelle Newton 25-yard pass from J.J. Raterink (Chris Gould kick), 10:49
- Milwaukee – Damian Harrell 5-yard pass from Chris Greisen (Robert Forstrom kick no good), 7:52
- Chicago – Syvelle Newton 12-yard pass from J.J. Raterink (Chris Gould kick), 4:52

Passing

- Chicago – J.J. Raterink: 25/42, 295 yards, 7 TD, 1 INT
- Milwaukee – Chris Greisen: 26/32, 310 yards, 7 TD, 1 INT

Rushing

- Chicago – J.J. Raterink: 2 att, 13 yards
- Milwaukee – Antoine Burns: 1 att, 15 yards

Receiving

- Chicago – Syvelle Newton: 11 rec, 123 yards, 5 TD
- Milwaukee – Antoine Burns: 9 rec, 135 yards, 4 TD
