= 2010 Cleveland Gladiators season =

Arena Football League team season

- Head coach: Steve Thonn
- Home stadium: Quicken Loans Arena

Results
- Record: 7–9
- Division place: 3rd NC Midwest
- Playoffs: Did not qualify

The 2010 Cleveland Gladiators season was the 11th season for the franchise in the Arena Football League, and the second while in Cleveland. The team was coached by Steve Thonn and played their home games at Quicken Loans Arena. The Gladiators missed out on the playoffs by finishing 5th in the National Conference with a 7–9 record.

== Standings ==
Midwest Division
Team	W	L	PCT	PF	PA	DIV	CON	Home	Away
y-Milwaukee Iron	11	5	.687	1043	903	5–1	8–3	7–1	4–4
x-Chicago Rush	10	6	.625	906	873	4–2	8–3	5–3	5–3
Cleveland Gladiators	7	9	.438	938	906	2–4	4–6	4–4	3–5
Iowa Barnstormers	7	9	.438	829	833	1–5	3–7	2–6	5–3

y - Clinched division
x - Clinched playoff berth

== Regular season schedule ==
The Gladiators began their season at home against the Rattlers on April 3. Their final regular season game was on July 31, when they hosted the Iron.

Week	Day	Date	Kickoff	Opponent	Results		Stadium	Report
Week	Day	Date	Kickoff	Opponent	Score	Record	Stadium	Report
1	Saturday	April 3	7:00 pm	Arizona Rattlers	L 56–61	0–1	Quicken Loans Arena	
2	Friday	April 9	8:00 pm	at Chicago Rush	L 56–59	0–2	Allstate Arena	
3	Saturday	April 17	8:05 pm	at Oklahoma City Yard Dawgz	L 50–63	0–3	Cox Convention Center	
4	Bye							
5	Saturday	May 1	10:00 pm	at Spokane Shock	W 72–68	1–3	Spokane Veterans Memorial Arena	
6	Saturday	May 8	8:05 pm	at Iowa Barnstormers	W 70–56	2–3	Wells Fargo Arena	
7	Saturday	May 15	7:00 pm	Tulsa Talons	W 68–55	3–3	Quicken Loans Arena	
8	Saturday	May 22	7:05 pm	at Jacksonville Sharks	L 44–46	3–4	Jacksonville Veterans Memorial Arena	
9	Saturday	May 29	7:00 pm	Chicago Rush	L 49–52	3–5	Quicken Loans Arena	
10	Friday	June 4	7:30 pm	Utah Blaze	W 75–39	4–5	Quicken Loans Arena	
11	Saturday	June 12	8:00 pm	at Milwaukee Iron	L 54–82	4–6	Bradley Center	
12	Saturday	June 19	7:00 pm	Iowa Barnstormers	W 76–35	5–6	Quicken Loans Arena	
13	Saturday	June 26	8:00 pm	at Tulsa Talons	L 44–65	5–7	BOK Center	
14	Saturday	July 3	7:30 pm	at Orlando Predators	W 77–70 (OT)	6–7	Amway Arena	
15	Saturday	July 10	7:00 pm	Spokane Shock	L 56–62 (OT)	6–8	Quicken Loans Arena	
16	Saturday	July 17	7:00 pm	Oklahoma City Yard Dawgz	W 44–39	7–8	Quicken Loans Arena	
17	Bye							
18	Saturday	July 31	7:00 pm	Milwaukee Iron	L 47–54	7–9	Quicken Loans Arena	

All times are EDT

== Roster ==
2010 Cleveland Gladiators roster
Quarterbacks: 8 John Dutton; 9 Kevin McCabe; Fullbacks: -- Terrell Browden; -- Russ Monk; Wide receivers: -- Jermaine Lewis; -- Steve Sanders; -- Victor Williams	Offensive linemen: 51 Billy Eisenhardt; 94 Jason Jones; 68 Ryan Stanchek; -- Adam Tadisch; Defensive linemen: -- Larry Harrison; 13 Anthony Hoke; -- Lance Witherspoon	Linebackers: 49 Tim Cheatwood; Defensive backs: 3 Michael Bragg; 23 Levy Brown; -- Carlos Campbell; -- Erick Harris; -- Davion Mitchell; -- Joe Phinisee; Kickers: -- Matt Denny	Injured reserve: -- Donovan Arp DL (IR); 5 Brent Holmes WR (IR); -- Chris Johnson WR (IR); 80 Ben Nelson WR (IR); -- T. J. Watkins OL (IR); Other league exempt: Currently vacant; Refused to report: Currently vacant; League suspension: Currently vacant; Recallable Reassignment: Currently vacant; Rookies in italics Roster updated March 5, 2013; 22 Active, 5 Inactive → More rosters

== Regular season ==
=== Week 1: vs. Arizona Rattlers ===
Quarter	1	2	3	4	Total
Rattlers	7	7	21	26	61
Gladiators	14	21	7	14	56

at Quicken Loans Arena, Cleveland, Ohio

- Date: April 3
- Game time: 7:00 pm EDT
- Game attendance: 11,688
- Referee: Ron Tobert
- Recap

Game information

1st quarter

- Cleveland – Ben Nelson 8-yard pass from John Dutton (Matt Denny kick), 11:23
- Arizona – Trandon Harvey 16-yard pass from Nick Davila (Jason Witczak kick), 3:41
- Cleveland – Brent Holmes 25-yard pass from John Dutton (Matt Denny kick), 1:48

2nd quarter

- Cleveland – Ben Nelson 15-yard pass from John Dutton (Matt Denny kick), 10:55
- Cleveland – Ben Nelson 31-yard pass from John Dutton (Matt Denny kick), 5:49
- Arizona – Riley Swanson 24-yard interception return (Jason Witczak kick), 3:30
- Cleveland – Brent Holmes 24-yard pass from John Dutton (Matt Denny kick), 0:49

3rd quarter

- Arizona – Trandon Harvey 58-yard kickoff return (Jason Witczak kick), 14:38
- Arizona – Trandon Harvey 2-yard run (Jason Witczak pass no good), 7:13
- Arizona – Trandon Harvey 15-yard pass from Nick Davila (Johnie Kirton run), 2:14
- Cleveland – Carlos Campbell 12-yard kickoff return (Matt Denny kick), 2:07

4th quarter

- Arizona – Johnie Kirton 1-yard run (Jason Witczak kick no good), 12:48
- Cleveland – Chris Johnson 6-yard pass from John Dutton (Matt Denny kick), 8:22
- Arizona – 58-yard kickoff return (Jason Witczak kick), 8:08
- Cleveland – Ben Nelson 35-yard pass from John Dutton (Matt Denny kick), 6:44
- Arizona – Rod Windsor 31-yard pass from Nick Davila (Jason Witczak kick), 5:23
- Arizona – Rod Windsor 3-yard pass from Nick Davila (Nick Davilla pass no good), 3:30

Passing

- Arizona – Nick Davila: 26/39, 273 yards, 4 TD, 1 INT
- Cleveland – John Dutton: 19/31, 287 yards, 7 TD, 4 INT

Rushing

- Arizona – Johnie Kirton: 5 att, 15 yards, 1 TD
- Cleveland – TJ Watkins: 1 att, 4 yards

Receiving

- Arizona – Rod Windsor: 13 rec, 175 yards, 2 TD
- Cleveland – Ben Nelson: 8 rec, 154 yards, 4 TD

At halftime, the Gladiators led by three touchdowns, and never trailed in the entire game until giving up a 3-yard touchdown pass to go down 61–56 with 3:30 remaining. Quarterback John Dutton threw a pick on what would prove to be Cleveland's final drive, as their defense was unable to keep Arizona from running out the clock to end the game. It was just one of Dutton's 4 interceptions on the night, though he did have 7 touchdowns, and threw for 287 yards.

=== Week 2: at Chicago Rush ===
Quarter	1	2	3	4	Total
Gladiators	14	14	14	14	56
Rush	14	14	14	17	59

at Allstate Arena, Rosemont, Illinois

- Date: April 9
- Game time: 8:00 pm EDT
- Game attendance: 8,075
- Referee: Tom McCabe
- Recap

Game information

1st quarter

- Chicago – Samie Parker 42-yard pass from Russ Michna (Chris Gould kick), 14:03
- Cleveland – Ben Nelson 15-yard pass from John Dutton (Matt Denny kick), 12:15
- Cleveland – Brent Holmes 3-yard pass from John Dutton (Matt Denny kick), 5:23
- Chicago – Nichiren Flowers 29-yard pass from Russ Michna (Chris Gould kick), 2:21

2nd quarter

- Cleveland – Ben Nelson 5-yard pass from John Dutton (Matt Denny kick), 11:08
- Chicago – Samie Parker 6-yard pass from Russ Michna (Chris Gould kick), 5:47
- Cleveland – Chris Johnson 1-yard run (Matt Denny kick), 2:30
- Chicago – Kenny Higgins 4-yard pass from Russ Michna (Chris Gould kick), 1:00

3rd quarter

- Chicago – Robert Boss 18-yard pass from Russ Michna (Chris Gould kick), 9:03
- Cleveland – Brent Holmes 25-yard pass from John Dutton (Matt Denny kick), 6:01
- Cleveland – TJ Watkins 1-yard run (Matt Denny kick), 3:26
- Chicago – Kenny Higgins 16-yard pass from Russ Michna (Chris Gould kick), 0:00

4th quarter

- Chicago – Nichiren Flowers 25-yard pass from Russ Michna (Chris Gould kick), 10:25
- Cleveland – Ben Nelson 5-yard pass from John Dutton (Matt Denny kick), 6:49
- Chicago – Samie Parker 28-yard pass from Russ Michna (Chris Gould kick), 3:30
- Cleveland – Ben Nelson 13-yard pass from John Dutton (Matt Denny kick), 0:45
- Chicago – Chris Gould 12-yard field goal, 0:02

Passing

- Cleveland – John Dutton: 37/52, 379 yards, 6 TD, 3 INT
- Chicago – Russ Michna: 22/27, 315 yards, 8 TD

Rushing

- Cleveland – Brent Holmes: 1 att, 6 yards
- Chicago – Russ Michna: 3 att, 13 yards

Receiving

- Cleveland – Ben Nelson: 12 rec, 133 yards, 4 TD
- Chicago – Samie Parker: 9 rec, 148 yards, 3 TD

In a closely contested game that saw neither team at any point lead by more than a touchdown, the Gladiators fell to 0–2 after being unable to come up with the game's last score. Following a 13-yard passing touchdown and successful extra point to tie the game at 56–56, the Gladiators allowed the Rush to drive all the way to the 4-yard line, where the Rush kicked a field goal to go ahead. After taking the ensuing kickoff for a touchback, Brent Holmes caught a pass as time expired, but did not get far with the ball, failing to even cross midfield before being tackled, ending the game. Contributing to the loss was Cleveland's turnovers. Quarterback John Dutton threw for 379 yards, but had 3 interceptions in the game. Brent Holmes, Chris Johnson, and Ben Nelson each had over 100 yards receiving in the losing effort.

=== Week 3: at Oklahoma City Yard Dawgz ===
Quarter	1	2	3	4	Total
Gladiators	7	24	0	19	50
Yard Dawgz	0	28	14	21	63

at Cox Convention Center, Oklahoma City, Oklahoma

- Date: April 17
- Game time: 8:05 pm EDT
- Recap

Game information

1st quarter

- Cleveland – Brent Holmes 9-yard pass from John Dutton (Matt Denny kick), 2:55

2nd quarter

- Cleveland – Ryan Stanchek 5-yard pass from John Dutton (Matt Denny kick), 13:04
- Oklahoma City – Timon Marshall 58-yard kickoff return (A.J. Haglund kick), 12:10
- Cleveland – Ben Nelson 17-yard pass from John Dutton (Matt Denny kick), 9:43
- Oklahoma City – Al Hunt 1-yard run (A.J. Haglund kick), 7:30
- Oklahoma City – Al Hunt 1-yard run (A.J. Haglund kick), 2:31
- Cleveland – Ben Nelson 11-yard pass from John Dutton (Matt Denny kick), 0:54
- Oklahoma City – Kelly Butler 10-yard pass from Tommy Grady (A.J. Haglund kick), 0:29
- Cleveland – Matt Denny 28-yard field goal, 0:00

3rd quarter

- Oklahoma City – Al Hunt 1-yard run (A.J. Haglund kick), 11:10
- Oklahoma City – Timon Marshall 28-yard pass from Tommy Grady (A.J. Haglund kick), 7:06

4th quarter

- Oklahoma City – Al Hunt 33-yard pass from Tommy Grady (A.J. Haglund kick), 10:57
- Cleveland – Ben Nelson 6-yard pass from John Dutton (Matt Denny kick), 8:47
- Oklahoma City – Al Hunt 12-yard pass from Tommy Grady (A.J. Haglund kick), 2:24
- Cleveland – Chris Johnson 39-yard pass from John Dutton (John Dutton pass no good), 1:56
- Oklahoma City – C.J. McLain 7-yard run (A.J. Haglund kick), 0:55
- Cleveland – Chris Johnson 2-yard pass from John Dutton (Matt Denny kick blacked), 0:22

Passing

- Cleveland – John Dutton: 35/50, 309 yards, 7 TD, 1 INT
- Oklahoma City – Tommy Grady: 20/33, 276 yards, 4 TD

Rushing

- Cleveland – T.J. Watkins: 1 att, 8 yards
- Oklahoma City – C.J. McLain: 5 att, 27 yards, 1 TD

Receiving

- Cleveland – Chris Johnson: 13 rec, 133 yards, 2 TD
- Oklahoma City – Timon Marshall: 5 rec, 67 yards, 1 TD

The Gladiators held a 14–0 lead early in the 2nd quarter, but the lead was cut to only 3 points at halftime when they allowed 4 touchdowns in the remainder of the half, including a kickoff returned for a touchdown, and a pair of 1-yard rushes into the end zone. In the 3rd quarter the Gladiators failed to score, falling into a hole they couldn't climb out of, as both teams scored 3 touchdowns each in the final quarter. Quarterback John Dutton attempted 50 passes, completing 35 for 309 yards and 7 touchdowns.

=== Week 5: at Spokane Shock ===
Quarter	1	2	3	4	Total
Gladiators	21	17	0	34	72
Shock	14	20	14	20	68

at Spokane Veterans Memorial Arena, Spokane, Washington

- Date: May 1
- Game time: 10:00 pm EDT
- Game attendance: 9,974
- Referee: Shane Anderson
- Recap

Game information

1st quarter

- Cleveland – Ben Nelson 46-yard pass from John Dutton (Matt Denny kick), 13:38
- Cleveland – Brent Holmes 24-yard pass from John Dutton (Matt Denny kick), 8:51
- Spokane – Branden Hall 10-yard pass from Kyle Rowley (Taylor Rowan kick), 5:22
- Spokane – James Todd 0-yard fumble return (Taylor Rowan kick), 2:58
- Cleveland – Ben Nelson 13-yard pass from John Dutton (John Dutton kick), 0:00

2nd quarter

- Spokane – Eddie Thompson 2-yard run (Taylor Rowan kick no good), 10:44
- Cleveland – Victor Williams 22-yard interception return (Matt Denny kick), 2:14
- Spokane – Raul Vijil 39-yard pass from Kyle Rowley (Taylor Rowan kick), 1:00
- Cleveland – Victor Williams 2-yard run (Matt Denny kick), 0:30
- Spokane – Markee White 34-yard pass from Kyle Rowley (Taylor Rowan kick), 0:22
- Cleveland – Matt Denny 33-yard field goal, 0:00

3rd quarter

- Spokane – Huey Whittaker 11-yard pass from Kyle Rowley (Taylor Rowan kick), 11:07
- Spokane – Markee White 4-yard pass from Kyle Rowley (Taylor Rowan kick), 4:50

4th quarter

- Cleveland – Ben Nelson 6-yard pass from John Dutton (Matt Denny kick), 12:10
- Cleveland – Russell Monk 48-yard run (Matt Denny kick), 12:44
- Spokane – Huey Whittaker 2-yard pass from Kyle Rowley (Taylor Rowan kick), 7:01
- Cleveland – Victor Williams 8-yard pass from John Dutton (Matt Denny kick), 2:40
- Spokane – Huey Whittaker 2-yard pass from Kyle Rowley (Taylor Rowan kick no good), 0:47
- Cleveland – Ben Nelson 23-yard pass from John Dutton (Matt Denny kick no good), 0:36
- Spokane – Raul Vijil 4-yard pass from Kyle Rowley (Taylor Rowan kick), 0:09
- Cleveland – Brent Holmes 56-yard kickoff return (Matt Denny kick), 0:02

Passing

- Cleveland – John Dutton: 25/39, 285 yards, 6 TD, 2 INT
- Spokane – Kyle Rowley: 29/44, 373 yards, 8 TD, 2 INT

Rushing

- Cleveland – Victor Williams: 1 att, 2 yards, 1 TD
- Spokane – Eddie Thompson: 3 att, 45 yard, 1 TD

Receiving

- Cleveland – Ben Nelson: 7 rec, 129 yards, 4 TD
- Spokane – Huey Whittaker: 11 rec, 149 yards, 3 TD

The Gladiators won their first game of the season in the last seconds of the game, which featured several lead changes in the final minute. Spokane went ahead 61–59 lead with 46 seconds on the clock with a 2-yard touchdown pass. The Gladiators got back in front on a 27-yard catch by Ben Nelson. The extra point was missed, but Cleveland still held a 65–61 advantage. The Shock responded by driving 45 yards in 5 plays, capped off by a touchdown pass from 4 yards out, pulling back ahead 68–65 with just 8 seconds left. Brent Holmes received the ensuing kickoff 6 yards back in the end zone and took it all the way back for a touchdown, giving the Gladiators a 72–68 lead with only a second to play in the game. Following the kickoff to the Shock, time had expired, however Spokane was given one more shot from scrimmage as the result of a penalty on the Gladiators for unsportsmanlike conduct after their go-ahead score. Spokane quarterback Kyle Rowley threw a pass that fell short of his intended target, giving the victory to Cleveland.

John Dutton finished with 285 yards passing and 6 touchdowns, however threw 2 interceptions. Ben Nelson was the top receiver with 129 yards and 4 touchdowns on the night.

=== Week 6: at Iowa Barnstormers ===
Quarter	1	2	3	4	Total
Gladiators	14	21	14	21	70
Barnstormers	12	24	7	13	56

at Wells Fargo Arena, Des Moines, Iowa

- Date: May 8
- Game time: 8:05 pm EDT
- Game attendance: 8,059
- Referee: Brad Van Vark
- Recap

Game information

1st quarter

- Iowa – Rodney Filer 16-yard run (Jeff Glas kick no good), 11:42
- Cleveland – Adam Tadisch 1-yard run (Matt Denny kick), 8:58
- Cleveland – Davion Mitchell 5-yard fumble return (Matt Denny kick), 6:03
- Iowa – Todd Blythe 25-yard pass from Ryan Vena (Jeff Glas kick no good), 3:28

2nd quarter

- Iowa – Ryan Vena 1-yard run (Jeff Glas kick), 12:39
- Cleveland – Davion Mitchell 55-yard kickoff return (Matt Denny kick), 12:08
- Iowa – Jesse Schmidt 36-yard pass from Ryan Vena (Jeff Glas kick), 10:24
- Iowa – Jason Simpson 5-yard kickoff return (Jeff Glas kick), 9:28
- Cleveland – Ben Nelson 14-yard pass from John Dutton (Matt Denny kick), 6:00
- Iowa – Jeff Glas 17-yard field goal, 0:52
- Cleveland – Chris Johnson 1-yard run (Matt Denny kick), 0:13

3rd quarter

- Cleveland – Victor Williams 3-yard run (Matt Denny kick), 12:36
- Iowa – Ryan Vena 2-yard run (Jeff Glas kick), 6:43
- Cleveland – Victor Williams 4-yard pass from John Dutton (Matt Denny kick), 0:29

4th quarter

- Cleveland – Ben Nelson 5-yard pass from John Dutton (Matt Denny kick), 10:14
- Iowa – Ryan Vena 2-yard run (Jeff Glas kick no good), 8:10
- Cleveland – Ben Nelson 14-yard pass from John Dutton (Matt Denny kick), 5:50
- Iowa – Ryan Vena 2-yard run (Jeff Glas kick), 4:03
- Cleveland – Chris Johnson 32-yard pass from John Dutton (Matt Denny kick), 1:02

Passing

- Cleveland – John Dutton: 31/39, 355 yards, 5 TD
- Iowa – Ryan Vena: 16/30, 275 yards, 2 TD, 1 INT

Rushing

- Cleveland – Victor Williams: 1 att, 3 yards, 1 TD
- Iowa – Ryan Vena: 10 att, 30 yard, 4 TD

Receiving

- Cleveland – Chris Johnson: 13 rec, 166 yards, 1 TD
- Iowa – Todd Blythe: 6 rec, 131 yards, 1 TD

The Gladiators fell behind by 12 points at one point in the 2nd quarter, but cut the Barnstormer's lead to 36–35 at halftime. In the 4th quarter, when the Gladiators took a 49–43 lead on a 4-yard touchdown reception by Victor Williams, they never trailed for the rest of the night. Putting the game away with a 32-yard touchdown catch by Chris Johnson with just over a minute to play, Cleveland won their second straight game. John Dutton had an outstanding night at quarterback, completing 31 of 39 passes, including his first 11 attempts. He finished with 355 passing yards and 5 touchdowns. Johnson, Williams, and Adam Tadisch each had a rushing touchdown. Ben Nelson had 3 receiving touchdowns, but it was Johnson who caught for the most yards, with 166.

=== Week 7: vs. Tulsa Talons ===
Quarter	1	2	3	4	Total
Talons	20	13	14	8	55
Gladiators	21	20	14	13	68

at Quicken Loans Arena, Cleveland, Ohio

- Date: May 15
- Game time: 7:00 pm EDT
- Game attendance: 8,979
- Referee: Ron Torbert
- Recap

Game information

1st quarter

- Cleveland – Ben Nelson 11-yard pass from John Dutton (Matt Denny kick), 10:22
- Tulsa – Jeff Hughley 15-yard pass from Justin Allgood (Tony Dodson kick no good), 9:15
- Cleveland – Chris Johnson 9-yard pass from John Dutton (Matt Denny kick), 6:15
- Tulsa – Jeff Hughley 29-yard pass from Justin Allgood (Tony Dodson kick), 3:56
- Cleveland – Ben Nelson 45-yard pass from John Dutton (Matt Denny kick), 2:40
- Tulsa – Donovan Morgan 33-yard pass from Justin Allgood (Tony Dodson kick), 1:25

2nd quarter

- Cleveland – Ben Nelson 26-yard pass from John Dutton (Matt Denny kick no good), 14:15
- Tulsa – Carlese Franklin 13-yard pass from Justin Allgood (Tony Dodson kick), 12:19
- Cleveland – Ben Nelson 9-yard pass from John Dutton (Matt Denny kick), 8:44
- Cleveland – Ben Nelson 4-yard pass from John Dutton (Matt Denny kick), 1:00
- Tulsa – Jeff Hughley 5-yard pass from Justin Allgood (Tony Dodson kick no good), 0:11

3rd quarter

- Tulsa – Adam Huebner 9-yard fumble return (Tony Dodson kick), 11:26
- Cleveland – TJ Watkins 1-yard run (Matt Denny kick), 5:21
- Tulsa – Donovan Morgan 16-yard pass from Justin Allgood (Tony Dodson kick), 1:34
- Cleveland – Chris Johnson 46-yard pass from John Dutton (Matt Denny kick), 0:18

4th quarter

- Tulsa – Carlese Franklin 11-yard pass from Justin Allgood (Donovan Morgan pass), 12:04
- Cleveland – Chris Johnson 4-yard pass from John Dutton (Matt Denny kick), 9:19
- Cleveland – Ben Nelson 28-yard pass from John Dutton (Matt Denny kick no good), 3:48

Passing

- Tulsa – Justin Allgood: 24/37, 352 yards, 7 TD, 2 INT
- Cleveland – John Dutton: 28/48, 397 yards, 9 TD

Rushing

- Tulsa – Odie Armstrong: 3 att, 17 yards
- Cleveland – Russell Monk: 4 att, 11 yards

Receiving

- Tulsa – Donovan Morgan: 11 rec, 188 yards, 2 TD
- Cleveland – Ben Nelson: 13 rec, 202 yards, 6 TD

=== Week 8: at Jacksonville Sharks ===
Quarter	1	2	3	4	Total
Gladiators	14	9	7	14	44
Sharks	14	6	7	19	46

at Jacksonville Veterans Memorial Arena, Jacksonville, Florida

- Date: May 22
- Game time: 7:05 pm EDT
- Recap

Game information

1st quarter

- Jacksonville – Dallas Baker 44-yard pass from Aaron Garcia (Patrick Bugg kick)
- Cleveland – Ben Nelson 32-yard pass from John Dutton (Matt Denny kick), 11:18
- Jacksonville – Jomo Wilson 30-yard pass from Aaron Garcia (Mossimo Sbaccia kick), 5:56
- Cleveland – Terrell Browden 1-yard pass from John Dutton (Matt Denny kick), 0:00

2nd quarter

- Jacksonville – Jomo Wilson 31-yard pass from Aaron Garcia (Mossimo Sbaccia kick no good), 13:14
- Cleveland – John Dutton 3-yard run (Matt Denny kick no good), 5:20
- Cleveland – Matt Denny 17-yard field goal

3rd quarter

- Jacksonville – Dallas Baker 28-yard pass from Aaron Garcia (Mossimo Sbaccia kick), 3:30
- Cleveland – Ben Nelson 25-yard pass from John Dutton (Matt Denny kick), 0:00

4th quarter

- Jacksonville – Jomo Wilson 20-yard pass from Aaron Garcia (Mossimo Sbaccia kick), 13:03
- Cleveland – Russell Monk 1-yard run (Matt Denny kick), 8:22
- Jacksonville – Jason Willis 6-yard pass from Aaron Garcia (Mossimo Sbaccia kick no good), 3:38
- Jacksonville – Aaron Garcia 3-yard run (Mossimo Sbaccia kick no good), 0:55
- Cleveland – Ben Nelson 2-yard pass from John Dutton (Matt Denny kick), 0:14
- Cleveland – John Dutton: 29/52, 314 yards, 4 TD
- Jacksonville – Aaron Garcia: 23/40, 290 yards, 6 TD, 2 INT

Rushing

- Cleveland – John Dutton: 1 att, 3 yards, 1 TD
- Jacksonville – Kirby Griffin: 2 att, 21 yards

Receiving

- Cleveland – Ben Nelson: 11 rec, 136 yards, 3 TD
- Jacksonville – Jomo Wilson: 7 rec, 116 yards, 3 TD

=== Week 9: vs. Chicago Rush ===
Quarter	1	2	3	4	Total
Rush	7	14	9	22	52
Gladiators	14	14	7	14	49

at Quicken Loans Arena, Cleveland, Ohio

- Date: May 29
- Game time: 7:00 pm EDT
- Game attendance: 8,688
- Referee: Ron Torbet
- Recap

Game information

1st quarter

- Cleveland – Brent Holmes 6-yard pass from John Dutton (Matt Denny kick), 10:06
- Chicago – Robert Boss 4-yard run (Chris Gould kick), 4:09
- Cleveland – Brent Holmes 32-yard pass from John Dutton (Matt Denny kick), 1:38

2nd quarter

- Chicago – Samie Parker 14-yard pass from Russ Michna (Chris Gould kick), 12:59
- Cleveland – Russell Monk 3-yard pass from John Dutton (Matt Denny kick), 9:48
- Cleveland – Ben Nelson 30-yard pass from John Dutton (Matt Denny kick), 1:51
- Chicago – DeJuan Alfonzo 1-yard run (Chris Gould kick), 0:02

3rd quarter

- Chicago – Nichiren Flowers 24-yard pass from Russ Michna (Chris Gould kick no good), 13:38
- Cleveland – Terrell Browden 1-yard run (Matt Denny kick), 7:58
- Chicago – Chris Gould 16-yard field goal, 4:06

4th quarter

- Chicago – Samie Parker 27-yard pass from Russ Michna (Russ Michna run no good), 13:56
- Cleveland – Russell Monk 2-yard run (Matt Denny kick), 7:52
- Chicago – Allen Turner 22-yard pass from Russ Michna (Chris Gould kick no good), 6:23
- Chicago – Chris Gould 26-yard field goal, 0:39
- Cleveland – Ben Nelson 20-yard pass from John Dutton (Matt Denny kick), 0:22
- Chicago – Chris Martin 57-yard kickoff return (Chris Gould kick), 0:14

Passing

- Chicago – Russ Michna: 22/29, 272 yards, 4 TD
- Cleveland – John Dutton: 28/39, 351 yards, 5 TD, 1 INT

Rushing

- Chicago – Robert Boss: 4 att, 19 yards, 1 TD
- Cleveland – Russell Monk: 3 att, 6 yards, 1 TD

Receiving

- Chicago – Samie Parker: 8 rec, 114 yards, 2 TD
- Cleveland – Steve Sanders: 14 rec, 173 yards

=== Week 10: vs. Utah Blaze ===
Quarter	1	2	3	4	Total
Blaze	6	7	14	12	39
Gladiators	6	20	28	21	75

at Quicken Loans Arena, Cleveland, Ohio

- Date: June 4
- Game time: 7:30 pm EDT
- Game attendance: 7,751
- Referee: Ron Torbert
- Recap

=== Week 11: at Milwaukee Iron ===
Quarter	1	2	3	4	Total
Gladiators	14	27	7	6	54
Iron	13	28	21	20	82

at Bradley Center, Milwaukee, Wisconsin

- Date: June 12
- Game time: 8:00 PM EDT
- Recap

Game information

1st quarter

- Cleveland – Brent Holmes 10-yard pass from John Dutton (Matt Denny kick), 14:26
- Milwaukee – Anthony Jones 9-yard pass from Chris Greisen (Robert Forstrom kick no good), 8:25
- Cleveland – Chris Johnson 15-yard pass from John Dutton (Matt Denny kick), 4:45
- Milwaukee – Tyre Young 1-yard run (Robert Forstrom kick), 1:00

2nd quarter

- Cleveland – Russell Monk 1-yard run (Matt Denny kick blocked), 11:13
- Milwaukee – Anthony Jones 12-yard pass from Chris Greisen (Robert Forstrom kick), 9:09
- Cleveland – Chris Johnson 7-yard pass from John Dutton (Matt Denny kick), 6:46
- Milwaukee – Antoine Burns 57-yard kickoff return (Robert Forstrom kick), 5:54
- Cleveland – Ben Nelson 17-yard pass from John Dutton (Matt Denny kick), 4:09
- Milwaukee – Anthony Jones 18-yard pass from Chris Greisen (Robert Forstrom kick), 0:47
- Cleveland – Ben Nelson 22-yard pass from John Dutton (Matt Denny kick), 0:22
- Milwaukee – Anthony Jones 29-yard pass from Chris Greisen (Robert Forstrom kick), 0:09

3rd quarter

- Milwaukee – Tyre Young 2-yard run (Robert Forstrom kick), 12:45
- Milwaukee – Perry Kyles 3-yard kickoff return (Robert Forstrom kick), 12:03
- Cleveland – Ben Nelson 10-yard pass from John Dutton (Matt Denny kick), 8:25
- Milwaukee – Antoine Burns 38-yard pass from Chris Greisen (Robert Forstrom kick), 6:40

4th quarter

- Milwaukee – Tracy Belton 48-yard fumble return (Robert Forstrom kick), 12:43
- Milwaukee – Anthony Jones 23-yard pass from Chris Greisen (Robert Forstrom kick), 4:27
- Cleveland – Brent Holmes 2-yard pass from John Dutton (Matt Denny kick no good), 0:29
- Milwaukee – Anthony Jones 12-yard pass from Chris Crane (Robert Forstrom kick blocked), 0:23
- Cleveland – John Dutton: 30/45, 324 yards, 7 TD
- Milwaukee – Chris Greisen: 23/28, 286 yards, 6 TD

Rushing

- Cleveland – Chris Johnson: 1 att, 11 yards
- Milwaukee – Tyre Young: 5 att, 19 yards, 2 TD

Receiving

- Cleveland – Ben Nelson: 13 rec, 152 yards, 3 TD
- Milwaukee – Anthony Jones: 11 rec, 138 yards, 6 TD

=== Week 12: vs. Iowa Barnstormers ===
Quarter	1	2	3	4	Total
Barnstormers	7	14	7	7	35
Gladiators	14	21	14	27	76

at Quicken Loans Arena, Cleveland, Ohio

- Date: June 19
- Game time: 7:00 pm EDT
- Game attendance: 8,179
- Referee: Ron Torbert
- Recap

Game information

1st quarter

- Cleveland – Russell Monk 1-yard run (Matt Denny kick), 11:48
- Iowa – Rodney Filer 3-yard run (Jeff Glas kick), 8:38
- Cleveland – Chris Johnson 13-yard pass from John Dutton (Matt Denny kick), 5:46

2nd quarter

- Cleveland – Ben Nelson 3-yard pass from John Dutton (Matt Denny kick), 13:42
- Iowa – Tommy Ellingworth 29-yard pass from Ryan Vena (Jeff Glas kick), 12:29
- Cleveland – Brent Holmes 13-yard pass from John Dutton (Matt Denny kick), 7:57
- Iowa – Tommy Ellingworth 6-yard pass from Ryan Vena (Jeff Glas kick), 3:11
- Cleveland – Ben Nelson 9-yard pass from John Dutton (Matt Denny kick), 0:09

3rd quarter

- Cleveland – Ben Nelson 30-yard pass from John Dutton (Matt Denny kick), 7:44
- Cleveland – Levy Brown 13-yard interception return (Matt Denny kick), 6:10
- Iowa – Todd Blythe 19-yard pass from Ryan Vena (Jeff Glas kick), 0:00

4th quarter

- Cleveland – Ben Nelson 38-yard pass from John Dutton (Matt Denny kick blocked)
- Iowa – Todd Blythe 5-yard pass from Ryan Vena (Jeff Glas kick), 12:12
- Cleveland – Carlos Campbell 47-yard fumble return (Matt Denny kick), 6:00
- Cleveland – Brent Holmes 29-yard pass from John Dutton (Matt Denny kick), 4:06
- Cleveland – Ben Nelson 6-yard pass from Kevin McCabe (Matt Denny kick), 1:00

Passing

- Iowa – Ryan Vena: 18/24, 207 yards, 4 TD, 1 INT
- Cleveland – John Dutton: 24/40, 284 yards, 7 TD

Rushing

- Iowa – Tommy Ellingworth: 1 att, 40 yards
- Cleveland – Ben Nelson: 1 att, 5 yards

Receiving

- Iowa – Todd Blythe: 8 rec, 100 yards, 2 TD
- Cleveland – Ben Nelson: 11 rec, 157 yards, 5 TD

=== Week 13: at Tulsa Talons ===
Quarter	1	2	3	4	Total
Gladiators	14	10	6	14	44
Talons	13	22	7	23	65

at BOK Center, Tulsa, Oklahoma

- Date: June 26
- Game time: 8:00 pm EDT
- Recap

=== Week 14: at Orlando Predators ===
Quarter	1	2	3	4	OT	Total
Gladiators	21	14	14	21	7	77
Predators	0	28	21	21	0	70

at Amway Arena, Orlando, Florida

- Date: July 3
- Game time: 7:30 pm EDT
- Game attendance: 10,101
- Recap

Game information

1st quarter

- Cleveland – Brent Holmes 35-yard pass from John Dutton (Matt Denny kick), 13:50
- Cleveland – Russell Monk 2-yard run (Matt Denny kick), 7:51
- Cleveland – Ben Nelson 17-yard pass from John Dutton (Matt Denny kick), 2:38

2nd quarter

- Orlando – T.T. Toliver 19-yard pass from Nick Hill (Carlos Martinez kick), 14:11
- Cleveland – Brent Holmes 5-yard pass from John Dutton (Matt Denny kick)
- Orlando – Bobby Sippio 33-yard pass from Nick Hill (Carlos Martinez kick), 9:20
- Orlando – Bobby Sippio 9-yard pass from Nick Hill (Carlos Martinez kick), 4:28
- Orlando – C.L. Grogan 40-yard fumble return (Carlos Martinez kick), 0:50
- Cleveland – Brent Holmes 23-yard pass from John Dutton (Matt Denny kick), 0:12

3rd quarter

- Cleveland – Brent Holmes 43-yard pass from John Dutton (Matt Denny kick), 11:45
- Orlando – Bobby Sippio 8-yard pass from Nick Hill (Carlos Martinez kick), 6:35
- Cleveland – Chris Johnson 26-yard pass from John Dutton (Matt Denny kick), 4:48
- Orlando – Bobby Sippio 20-yard pass from Nick Hill (Carlos Martinez kick), 3:11
- Orlando – Nick Hill 8-yard run (Carlos Martinez kick), 0:00

4th quarter

- Cleveland – Ben Nelson 13-yard pass from John Dutton (Matt Denny kick), 10:14
- Orlando – Bobby Sippio 38-yard pass from Nick Hill (Carlos Martinez kick), 9:01
- Orlando – Kenny McEntyre 23-yard interception return (Carlos Martinez kick), 7:22
- Cleveland – Chris Johnson 4-yard pass from John Dutton (Davion Mitchell kick), 2:32
- Orlando – Jerrian James 28-yard pass from Nick Hill (Carlos Martinez kick), 0:31
- Cleveland – Brent Holmes 5-yard pass from John Dutton (Matt Denny kick), 0:09

Overtime

- Cleveland – Chris Johnson 9-yard pass from John Dutton (Matt Denny kick), 8:58

Passing

- Cleveland – John Dutton: 36/53, 411 yards, 10 TD, 2 INT
- Orlando – Nick Hill: 21/35, 291 yards, 7 TD, 1 INT

Rushing

- Cleveland – Russell Monk: 3 att, 5 yards, 1 TD
- Orlando – Nick Hill: 4 att, 33 yards, 1 TD

Receiving

- Cleveland – Brent Holmes: 12 rec, 199 yards, 5 TD
- Orlando – Bobby Sippio: 9 rec, 147 yards, 5 TD

=== Week 15: vs. Spokane Shock ===
Quarter	1	2	3	4	OT	Total
Shock	14	21	14	7	6	62
Gladiators	7	21	14	14	0	56

at Quicken Loans Arena, Cleveland Ohio

- Date: July 10
- Game time: 7:00 pm EDT
- Game attendance: 8,237
- Recap

Game information

1st quarter

- Cleveland – Ben Nelson 22-yard pass from John Dutton (Matt Denny kick), 12:00
- Spokane – Huey Whittaker 22-yard pass from Kyle Rowley (Taylor Rowan kick), 8:38
- Spokane – Shaun Kauleinamoku 13-yard pass from Kyle Rowley (Taylor Rowan kick), 0:01

2nd quarter

- Spokane – Huey Whittaker 14-yard pass from Kyle Rowley (Taylor Rowan kick), 12:24
- Cleveland – Russell Monk 2-yard run (Matt Denny kick), 6:31
- Spokane – Huey Whittaker 3-yard pass from Kyle Rowley (Taylor Rowan kick), 3:53
- Cleveland – Adam Tadisch 19-yard pass from John Dutton (Matt Denny kick), 0:54
- Spokane – Greg Orton 4-yard pass from Kyle Rowley (Taylor Rowan kick), 0:46
- Cleveland – Ben Nelson 8-yard pass from John Dutton (Matt Denny kick), 0:19

3rd quarter

- Spokane – Huey Whittaker 32-yard pass from Kyle Rowley (Taylor Rowan kick), 11:04
- Cleveland – Russell Monk 2-yard run (Matt Denny kick), 6:39
- Spokane – Clay Harrell 1-yard run (Taylor Rowan kick), 3:53
- Cleveland – Joe Phinisee 22-yard pass from John Dutton (Matt Denny kick), 0:52

4th quarter

- Spokane – Huey Whittaker 16-yard pass from Kyle Rowley (Taylor Rowan kick), 8:50
- Cleveland – T.J. Watkins 1-yard run (Matt Denny kick), 1:22
- Cleveland – Brent Holmes 7-yard pass from John Dutton (Matt Denny kick), 0:26

Overtime

- Spokane – Travis Williams 43-yard interception return
- Spokane – Kyle Rowley: 25/38, 298 yards, 7 TD
- Cleveland – John Dutton: 27/45, 294 yards, 5 TD, 1 INT

Rushing

- Spokane – Kyle Rowley: 2 att, 15 yards
- Cleveland – Russell Monk: 3 att, 5 yards, 2 TD

Receiving

- Spokane – Huey Whittaker: 11 rec, 153 yards, 5 TD
- Cleveland – Anthony Jones: 5 rec, 95 yards, 2 TD

=== Week 16: vs. Oklahoma City Yard Dawgz ===
Quarter	1	2	3	4	Total
Yard Dawgz	13	6	8	12	39
Gladiators	7	14	14	9	44

at Quicken Loans Arena, Cleveland Ohio

- Date: July 17
- Game time: 7:00 pm EDT
- Game attendance: 7,682
- Referee: Alex Kemp
- Recap

Game information

1st quarter

- Oklahoma City – Alvance Robinson 11-yard pass from Tommy Grady (Michael Salerno kick no good), 10:16
- Oklahoma City – Brandon Perkins 0-yard fumble return (Michael Salerno kick), 8:44
- Cleveland – Jermaine Lewis 4-yard pass from John Dutton (Matt Denny kick), 5:29

2nd quarter

- Cleveland – Brent Holmes 0-yard field goal return (Matt Denny kick), 14:08
- Cleveland – Michael Bragg 41-yard fumble return (Matt Denny kick), 9:18
- Oklahoma City – Xavier Lee 13-yard pass from Tommy Grady (Michael Salerno kick no good), 0:00

3rd quarter

- Cleveland – Jermaine Lewis 30-yard pass from John Dutton (Matt Denny kick), 13:52
- Oklahoma City – Xavier Lee 30-yard run (Jerel Myers pass), 2:09
- Cleveland – Victor Williams 21-yard pass from John Dutton (Matt Denny kick), 0:00

4th quarter

- Oklahoma City – Chad Cook 2-yard run (Michael Salerno kick no good), 10:17
- Cleveland – Matt Denny 12-yard field goal, 3:20
- Oklahoma City – Timon Marshall 8-yard pass from Xavier Lee (Chad Cook run no good), 1:00
- Cleveland – Victor Williams 45-yard pass from John Dutton (Victor Williams pass no good), 0:48
- Oklahoma City – Tommy Grady: 14/30, 159 yards, 2 TD, 2 INT
- Cleveland – John Dutton: 15/35, 242 yards, 4 TD

Rushing

- Oklahoma City – Xavier Lee: 1 att, 30 yards, 1 TD
- Cleveland – John Dutton and Victor Williams: 1 att, −1 yards

Receiving

- Oklahoma City – Timon Marshall: 6 rec, 66 yards, 1 TD
- Cleveland – Victor Williams: 6 rec, 132 yards, 2 TD

=== Week 18: vs. Milwaukee Iron ===
Quarter	1	2	3	4	Total
Iron	14	13	7	20	54
Gladiators	6	21	14	6	47

at Quicken Loans Arena, Cleveland Ohio

- Date: July 31
- Game time: 7:00 pm EDT
- Game attendance: 9,423
- Referee: Ron Torbert
- Recap

Game information

1st quarter

- Milwaukee – Antoine Burns 30-yard pass from Chris Greisen (Robert Forstrom kick), 13:46
- Cleveland – Victor Williams 8-yard pass from John Dutton (Matt Denny kick no good), 10:45
- Milwaukee – Tyre Young 3-yard run (Robert Forstrom kick), 2:21

2nd quarter

- Cleveland – Jermaine Lewis 15-yard pass from John Dutton (Matt Denny kick), 14:21
- Milwaukee – Damian Harrell 10-yard pass from Chris Greisen (Robert Forstrom kick), 12:38
- Cleveland – T.J. Watkins 2-yard pass from John Dutton (Matt Denny kick), 6:09
- Milwaukee – Anthony Jones 10-yard pass from Chris Greisen (Robert Forstrom kick no good), 1:59
- Cleveland – Brent Holmes 9-yard pass from John Dutton (Matt Denny kick), 0:32

3rd quarter

- Cleveland – Victor Williams 2-yard pass from John Dutton (Matt Denny kick), 11:10
- Milwaukee – Anthony Jones 34-yard pass from Chris Greisen (Robert Forstrom kick), 9:42
- Cleveland – Joe Phinisee 45-yard pass from John Dutton (Matt Denny kick), 8:53

4th quarter

- Cleveland – Joe Phinisee 13-yard pass from John Dutton (Matt Denny kick no good), 14:39
- Milwaukee – Anthony Jones 1-yard run (Robert Forstrom pass no good), 6:54
- Milwaukee – Trumaine Sykes 0-yard fumble return (Robert Forstrom kick), 5:26
- Milwaukee – Virgil Gray 12-yard pass from Chris Crane (Robert Forstrom kick), 2:21

Passing

- Milwaukee – Chris Greisen: 14/20, 204 yards, 4 TD
- Cleveland – John Dutton: 26/37, 298 yards, 7 TD, 2 INT

Rushing

- Milwaukee – Chris Crane: 5 att, 14 yards
- Cleveland – Victor Williams: 2 att, 1 yard

Receiving

- Milwaukee – Anthony Jones: 8 rec, 100 yards, 2 TD
- Cleveland – Brent Holmes: 10 rec, 103 yards, 1 TD
