= Corey Davis (offensive lineman) =

American football player (born 1985)

Profile
- Position: Offensive lineman

Personal information
- Born: July 14, 1985 (age 41); Lynwood, California, U.S.
- Listed height: 6 ft 3 in (1.91 m)
- Listed weight: 325 lb (147 kg)

Career information
- College: James Madison
- NFL draft: 2007: undrafted

Career history
- Georgia Force (2007)*; Buffalo Bills (2007)*; Georgia Force (2008); Milwaukee Mustangs (2010)
- * Offseason or practice squad member only

Awards and highlights
- NCAA Division I-AA national champion (2004); Second-team All-A-10 (2005)

Corey Davis (born July 14, 1985) is an American former football offensive lineman. He was originally signed by the Buffalo Bills as an undrafted free agent in 2007. He played college football at James Madison.

Pre-draft measurables
Height	Weight	40-yard dash	20-yard shuttle	Three-cone drill	Vertical jump	Broad jump	Bench press
6 ft 2 7/8 in (1.90 m)	328 lb (149 kg)	5.60 s	5.15 s	8.36 s	26.0 in (0.66 m)	7 ft 4 in (2.24 m)	12 reps
All values from Pro Day
