= 2010 Arizona Rattlers season =

Indoor football season

- Owner: Brett Bouchy
- General manager: Kevin Guy
- Head coach: Kevin Guy
- Home stadium: US Airways Center

Results
- Record: 10–6
- Division place: 2nd NC West
- Playoffs: Lost Conference semifinals (Shock) 49–57

The 2010 Arizona Rattlers season was the 19th season for the franchise in the Arena Football League. The team was coached by Kevin Guy and played their home games at US Airways Center. The Rattlers made the playoffs with a 10–6 record, fourth best in the National Conference, but were defeated by the top-seeded Spokane Shock in the conference semifinals, 49–57.

== Standings ==
West Division
| Team | W | L | PCT | PF | PA | DIV | CON | Home | Away |
| z-Spokane Shock | 13 | 3 | .812 | 988 | 843 | 4–0 | 8–2 | 6–2 | 7–1 |
| x-Arizona Rattlers | 10 | 6 | .625 | 987 | 885 | 2–2 | 5–5 | 5–3 | 5–3 |
| Utah Blaze | 2 | 14 | .125 | 742 | 1040 | 0–4 | 0–10 | 1–7 | 1–7 |

z - Clinched division and conference's best record
x - Clinched playoff berth

== Regular season schedule ==
The Rattlers opened their season on the road against the Gladiators on April 3. They will host the Rush on April 17 for their first home game of the season. The conclusion of the regular season was at home on July 31 against the Barnstormers.

| Week | Day | Date | Kickoff | Opponent | Results | | Location | Report |
| Week | Day | Date | Kickoff | Opponent | Score | Record | Location | Report |
|---|---|---|---|---|---|---|---|---|
| 1 | Saturday | April 3 | 7:00 pm | at Cleveland Gladiators | W 61–56 | 1–0 | Quicken Loans Arena | |
| 2 | Bye | | | | | | | |
| 3 | Friday | April 16 | 10:30 pm | Chicago Rush | L 56–70 | 1–1 | US Airways Center | |
| 4 | Friday | April 23 | 10:30 pm | Tulsa Talons | W 77–76 | 2–1 | US Airways Center | |
| 5 | Saturday | May 1 | 7:30 pm | at Tampa Bay Storm | L 61–62 | 2–2 | St. Pete Times Forum | |
| 6 | Friday | May 7 | 10:30 pm | Spokane Shock | L 56–63 | 2–3 | US Airways Center | |
| 7 | Bye | | | | | | | |
| 8 | Friday | May 21 | 8:05 pm | at Iowa Barnstormers | W 52–48 | 3–3 | Wells Fargo Arena | |
| 9 | Saturday | May 29 | 9:05 pm | at Utah Blaze | W 83–58 | 4–3 | E Center | |
| 10 | Saturday | June 5 | 10:30 pm | Milwaukee Iron | W 68–67 (OT) | 5–3 | US Airways Center | |
| 11 | Friday | June 11 | 10:30 pm | Oklahoma City Yard Dawgz | W 56–55 | 6–3 | US Airways Center | |
| 12 | Saturday | June 19 | 10:30 pm | Bossier–Shreveport Battle Wings | W 79–50 | 7–3 | US Airways Center | |
| 13 | Saturday | June 26 | 7:05 pm | at Jacksonville Sharks | W 66–50 | 8–3 | Jacksonville Veterans Memorial Arena | |
| 14 | Friday | July 2 | 10:00 pm | at Spokane Shock | L 36–37 | 8–4 | Spokane Veterans Memorial Arena | |
| 15 | Saturday | July 10 | 8:00 pm | at Chicago Rush | L 50–55 | 8–5 | Allstate Arena | |
| 16 | Friday | July 16 | 10:30 pm | Utah Blaze | W 48–20 | 9–5 | US Airways Center | |
| 17 | Saturday | July 24 | 8:00 pm | at Tulsa Talons | W 61–51 | 10–5 | BOK Center | |
| 18 | Saturday | July 31 | 10:30 pm | Iowa Barnstormers | L 47–67 | 10–6 | US Airways Center | |

All times are EDT

== Playoff schedule ==
| Round | Day | Date | Kickoff | Opponent | Score | Location | Report |
|---|---|---|---|---|---|---|---|
| NC Semifinals | Friday | August 6 | 11:00 pm | at Spokane Shock | L 49–57 | Spokane Veterans Memorial Arena | |

All times are EDT

== Final roster ==
2010 Arizona Rattlers roster
| Quarterbacks: 10 Nick Davila; 15 Billy Farris; Fullbacks: 54 John Booker; Wide receivers: 5 Siaha Burley; 23 Trandon Harvey; 5 J. J. McKelvey; 1 Rod Windsor | Offensive linemen: 63 Devin Clark; 69 Atlas Herrion; 56 Ronald Jones; 59 Kyle Young; Defensive linemen: 90 Alex Guerrero; -- Alan Harper; 77 Anttaj Hawthorne; 70 Marcus Pittman | Linebackers: 4 Kelvin Morris; 19 Dale Robinson; Defensive backs: 8 Brandon Freeman; 2 Terrance Sanders; 21 Riley Swanson; -- James Todd; Kickers: 9 Fabrizio Scaccia | Injured reserve: 55 Brennen Carvalho OL (IR); 3 Todd Devoe WR (IR); 37 Johnie Kirton FB (IR); -- Anthony Mix WR (IR); 44 Darrell Shropshire DL (IR); Team suspended: currently vacant; Refuse to report: -- Kevin Ingram WR (DNR); -- Jason Jones WR (DNR); -- Kurt Kahui LB (DNR); -- Frank Trentadue LB (DNR); Other league exempt: currently vacant; Inactive reserve: currently vacant; Recallable reassignment: currently vacant; rookies in italics Roster updated August 3, 2010; 22 Active, 10 Inactive |

== Regular season ==
=== Week 1: at Cleveland Gladiators ===
| Quarter | 1 | 2 | 3 | 4 | Total |
|---|---|---|---|---|---|
| Rattlers | 7 | 7 | 21 | 26 | 61 |
| Gladiators | 14 | 21 | 7 | 14 | 56 |

at Quicken Loans Arena, Cleveland, Ohio

- Date: April 3
- Game time: 7:00 pm EDT
- Game attendance: 11,688
- Referee: Ron Tobert
- Recap

Game information

1st quarter

- Cleveland – Ben Nelson 8-yard pass from John Dutton (Matt Denny kick), 11:23
- Arizona – Trandon Harvey 16-yard pass from Nick Davila (Jason Witczak kick), 3:41
- Cleveland – Brent Holmes 25-yard pass from John Dutton (Matt Denny kick), 1:48

2nd quarter

- Cleveland – Ben Nelson 15-yard pass from John Dutton (Matt Denny kick), 10:55
- Cleveland – Ben Nelson 31-yard pass from John Dutton (Matt Denny kick), 5:49
- Arizona – Riley Swanson 24-yard interception return (Jason Witczak kick), 3:30
- Cleveland – Brent Holmes 24-yard pass from John Dutton (Matt Denny kick), 0:49

3rd quarter

- Arizona – Trandon Harvey 58-yard kickoff return (Jason Witczak kick), 14:38
- Arizona – Trandon Harvey 2-yard run (Jason Witczak pass no good), 7:13
- Arizona – Trandon Harvey 15-yard pass from Nick Davila (Johnie Kirton run), 2:14
- Cleveland – Carlos Campbell 12-yard kickoff return (Matt Denny kick), 2:07

4th quarter

- Arizona – Johnie Kirton 1-yard run (Jason Witczak kick no good), 12:48
- Cleveland – Chris Johnson 6-yard pass from John Dutton (Matt Denny kick), 8:22
- Arizona – 58-yard kickoff return (Jason Witczak kick), 8:08
- Cleveland – Ben Nelson 35-yard pass from John Dutton (Matt Denny kick), 6:44
- Arizona – Rod Windsor 31-yard pass from Nick Davila (Jason Witczak kick), 5:23
- Arizona – Rod Windsor 3-yard pass from Nick Davila (Nick Davilla pass no good), 3:30

Passing

- Arizona – Nick Davila: 26/39, 273 yards, 4 TD, 1 INT
- Cleveland – John Dutton: 19/31, 287 yards, 7 TD, 4 INT

Rushing

- Arizona – Johnie Kirton: 5 att, 15 yards, 1 TD
- Cleveland – T.J. Watkins: 1 att, 4 yards

Receiving

- Arizona – Rod Windsor: 13 rec, 175 yards, 2 TD
- Cleveland – Ben Nelson: 8 rec, 154 yards, 4 TD

The Rattlers' special teams returned 7 kickoffs for 212 yards and 3 returned for touchdowns against a Gladiators team that gave up only one kickoff return for a touchdown in the last season they competed. Arizona's Rod Windsor was the most common target for quarterback Nick Davila, with 13 catches for 175 yards and 2 touchdowns. Davila himself completed 26 passes for 273 yards and 4 touchdowns.

=== Week 3: vs. Chicago Rush ===
| Quarter | 1 | 2 | 3 | 4 | Total |
|---|---|---|---|---|---|
| Rush | 14 | 28 | 14 | 14 | 70 |
| Rattlers | 14 | 21 | 7 | 14 | 56 |

at US Airways Center, Phoenix, Arizona

- Date: April 16
- Game time: 10:30 pm EDT
- Game attendance: 14,994
- Referee: Steve Kovac
- Recap

=== Week 4: vs. Tulsa Talons ===
| Quarter | 1 | 2 | 3 | 4 | Total |
|---|---|---|---|---|---|
| Talons | 14 | 20 | 14 | 28 | 76 |
| Rattlers | 17 | 19 | 14 | 27 | 77 |

at US Airways Center, Phoenix, Arizona

- Date: April 23
- Game time: 10:30 pm EDT
- Game attendance: 10,083
- Referee: Shawn Hochuli
- Recap

Game information

1st quarter

- Tulsa – Jeff Hughley 13-yard pass from Justin Allgood (Tony Dodson kick), 12:38
- Arizona – Anthony Mix 27-yard pass from Nick Davilla (Jason Witczak kick), 10:46
- Arizona – Jason Witczak 40-yard field goal
- Tulsa – Donovan Morgan 28-yard pass from Justin Allgood (Tony Dodson kick), 2:05
- Arizona – Rod Windsor 1-yard run (Jason Witczak kick), 0:00

2nd quarter

- Tulsa – Odie Armstrong 13-yard run (Tony Dodson kick), 14:32
- Arizona – Rod Windsor 22-yard pass from Nick Davilla (Jason Witczak kick), 11:02
- Tulsa – Jeff Hughley 20-yard fumble recovery (Tony Dodson kick no good), 8:28
- Arizona – Rod Windsor 24-yard pass from Nick Davilla (Jason Witczak kick), 3:57
- Tulsa – Donovan Morgan 12-yard pass from Justin Allgood (Tony Dodson kick), 0:45
- Arizona – Rod Windsor 6-yard run (Nick Davilla pass no good)

3rd quarter

- Tulsa – Donovan Morgan 24-yard pass from Justin Allgood (Tony Dodson kick), 13:17
- Arizona – Nick Davilla 1-yard run (Jason Witczak kick), 9:00
- Tulsa – Donovan Morgan 9-yard pass from Justin Allgood (Tony Dodson kick), 3:08
- Arizona – Rod Windsor 38-yard pass from Nick Davilla (Jason Witczak kick), 0:48

4th quarter

- Tulsa – Carlese Franklin 14-yard pass from Justin Allgood (Tony Dodson kick), 14:14
- Arizona – Rod Windsor 33-yard pass from Nick Davilla (Jason Witczak kick no good), 12:58
- Tulsa – Donovan Morgan 18-yard pass from Justin Allgood (Tony Dodson kick), 8:52
- Arizona – J. J. McKelvey 15-yard pass from Nick Davilla (Billy Farris run), 5:12
- Tulsa – Jeff Hughley 5-yard pass from Justin Allgood (Justin Allgood pass), 2:47
- Arizona – Rod Windsor 12-yard pass from Nick Davilla (Jason Witczak kick), 0:32
- Tulsa – Carlese Franklin 29-yard pass from Justin Allgood (Justin Allgood pass no good), 0:19
- Arizona – Rod Windsor 27-yard pass from Nick Davilla (Nick Davilla kick no good), 0:00

Passing

- Tulsa – Justin Allgood: 29/40, 350 yards, 10 TD, 1 INT
- Arizona – Nick Davila: 30/42, 413 yards, 8 TD, 1 INT

Rushing

- Tulsa – Odie Armstrong: 2 att, 9 yards, 1 TD
- Arizona – Rod Windsor: 2 att, 7 yards, 2 TD

Receiving

- Tulsa – Donovan Morgan: 9 rec, 128 yards, 5 TD
- Arizona – Rod Windsor: 16 rec, 230 yards, 6 TD

Rod Windsor's eighth touchdown of the night was the game winner for the Rattlers. On the final play of the game, on an untimed down, Windsor received a pass from Nick Davilla and hustled down the left side of the field, escaping two Tulsa defenders before reaching the end zone. Both teams went back-and-forth throughout the contest, with neither leading by more than one score at any point. The Rattlers finished with 419 yards of total offense, provided mostly by Nick Davilla who threw for 413 yards and 8 touchdowns. Windsor finished with 230 receiving yards, 6 touchdown receptions, and 2 rushing touchdowns. With the win, the Rattlers gave the Talons their first loss, while improving their own record to 2–1.

=== Week 5: at Tampa Bay Storm ===
| Quarter | 1 | 2 | 3 | 4 | Total |
|---|---|---|---|---|---|
| Rattlers | 7 | 14 | 13 | 27 | 61 |
| Storm | 14 | 20 | 14 | 14 | 62 |

at St. Pete Times Forum, Tampa, Florida

- Date: May 1
- Game time: 7:30 pm EDT
- Game attendance: 12,874
- Referee: Kevin Stine
- Recap

Game information

1st quarter

- Tampa Bay – Hank Edwards 9 yd pass from Brett Dietz (Garrett Rivas kick), 11:21
- Tampa Bay – Hank Edwards 29 yd pass from Brett Dietz (Garrett Rivas kick), 3:54
- Arizona – Brennan Carvalho 1 yd run (Jason Witczak kick), 0:00

2nd quarter

- Tampa Bay – DeAndrew Rubin 39 yd pass from Brett Dietz (Garrett Rivas kick), 13:08
- Arizona – Rod Windsor 15 yd pass from Nick Davila (Jason Witczak kick), 9:15
- Tampa Bay – DeAndrew Rubin 29 yd pass from Brett Dietz (Garrett Rivas kick no good), 4:43
- Arizona – J.J. McKelvey 16 yd pass from Nick Davila (Jason Witczak kick), 0:52
- Tampa Bay – Tyrone Timmons 3 yd pass from Brett Dietz (Garrett Rivas kick), 0:36

3rd quarter

- Arizona – Rod Windsor 7 yd pass from Nick Davila (Jason Witczak kick), 9:49
- Tampa Bay – DeAndrew Rubin 12 yd pass from Brett Dietz (Garrett Rivas kick), 8:31
- Arizona – Nick Davila 13 yd run (Atlas Herrion pass no good), 6:26
- Tampa Bay – DeAndrew Rubin 9 yd pass from Brett Dietz (Garrett Rivas kick), 3:09

4th quarter

- Arizona – J.J. McKelvey 10 yd pass from Nick Davila (Jason Witczak kick), 13:09
- Arizona – Anthony Mix 12 yd pass from Nick Davila (Jason Witczak kick), 9:17
- Tampa Bay – Tyrone Timmons 10 yd pass from Brett Dietz (Garrett Rivas kick no good), 4:33
- Arizona – Anthony Mix 26 yd pass from Nick Davila (Jason Witczak kick), 3:16
- Tampa Bay – DeAndrew Rubin 37 yd pass from Brett Dietz (Terrence Royal pass), 1:25
- Arizona – J.J. McKelvey 3 yd pass from Nick Davila (Anthony Mix pass no good), 0:07

Passing

- Arizona – Nick Davila: 27/47, 314 yards, 7 TD
- Tampa Bay – Brett Dietz: 19/32, 288 yards, 9 TD

Rushing

- Arizona – Rod Windsor: 1 att, 27 yards
- Tampa Bay – Terrence Royal: 1 att, 8 yards

Receiving

- Arizona – J.J. McKelvey: 13 rec, 127 yards, 3 TD
- Tampa Bay – DeAndrew Rubin: 9 rec, 184 yards, 5 TD

Although they trailed nearly the entire night, the Rattlers stayed in it, but came up short in the end. Tied at 48–48, the Rattlers gave up a touchdown to the Storm, however the Storm's kicker missed the extra point. Arizona scored on the next play from scrimmage, and following a successful extra point, took a 55–54 lead. Tampa Bay would take the lead back on a 37-yard passing touchdown, but rather than try another extra point, attempted a two-point conversion and made it, giving them a 62–55 lead. On Arizona's next drive covered 48 yards in just over a minute, ending with a touchdown with 7 seconds left. Instead of kicking an extra point, which would have tied the game, the Rattlers opted to go for two. Nick Davilla's pass to Anthony Mix was incomplete, although the Rattlers felt a defensive interference penalty should have been called on the play which would have given them a second chance at the conversion. No penalty was called however, and Arizona's ensuing onside kick was recovered by the Storm, effectively ending the game. Davilla finished the game with 314 yards and 7 touchdowns. J.J. McKelvey caught for 127 yards and 3 touchdowns.

=== Week 6: vs. Spokane Shock ===
| Quarter | 1 | 2 | 3 | 4 | Total |
|---|---|---|---|---|---|
| Shock | 14 | 14 | 14 | 21 | 63 |
| Rattlers | 14 | 14 | 14 | 14 | 56 |

at US Airways Center, Phoenix, Arizona

- Date: May 7
- Game time: 10:30 pm EDT
- Game attendance: 10,203
- Referee: Shawn Hochuli
- Recap

Game information

1st quarter

- Spokane – Raul Vijil 5-yard pass from Kyle Rowley (Taylor Rowan kick), 13:01
- Spokane – Eddie Thompson 2-yard run (Taylor Rowan kick), 4:49
- Arizona – Rod Windsor 3-yard pass from Nick Davila (Jason Witczak kick)
- Arizona – J.J. McKelvey 3-yard pass from Nick Davila (Jason Witczak kick), 1:04

2nd quarter

- Arizona – J.J. McKelvey 3-yard pass from Nick Davila (Jason Witczak kick), 10:55
- Spokane – Kyle Rowley 3-yard run (Taylor Rowan kick), 6:47
- Spokane – Huey Whittaker 3-yard pass from Kyle Rowley (Taylor Rowan kick), 0:44
- Arizona – J.J. McKelvey 2-yard pass from Nick Davila (Jason Witczak kick), 0:04

3rd quarter

- Arizona – J.J. McKelvey 23-yard pass from Nick Davila (Jason Witczak kick), 13:55
- Spokane – Raul Vijil 31-yard pass from Kyle Rowley (Taylor Rowan kick), 11:18
- Arizona – Rod Windsor 5-yard pass from Nick Davila (Jason Witczak kick), 7:01
- Spokane – Huey Whittaker 48-yard pass from Kyle Rowley (Taylor Rowan kick), 5:03

4th quarter

- Spokane – Raul Vijil 10-yard pass from Kyle Rowley (Taylor Rowan kick), 12:48
- Arizona – Rod Windsor 44-yard pass from Nick Davila (Jason Witczak kick), 12:06
- Spokane – Markee White 34-yard pass from Kyle Rowley (Taylor Rowan kick), 8:49
- Arizona – Johnie Kirton 2-yard run (Jason Witczak kick), 5:29
- Spokane – Raul Vijil 23-yard pass from Kyle Rowley (Taylor Rowan kick), 2:08

Passing

- Spokane – Kyle Rowley: 22/37, 369 yards, 7 TD
- Arizona – Nick Davila: 28/44, 346 yards, 7 TD, 2 INT

Rushing

- Spokane – Kyle Rowley: 1 att, 3 yards, 1 TD
- Arizona – Johnie Kirton: 4 att, 14 yards, 1 TD

Receiving

- Spokane – Raul Vijil: 10 rec, 157 yards, 4 TD
- Arizona – Rod Windsor: 14 rec, 157 yards, 3 TD

=== Week 8: at Iowa Barnstormers ===
| Quarter | 1 | 2 | 3 | 4 | Total |
|---|---|---|---|---|---|
| Rattlers | 13 | 18 | 7 | 14 | 52 |
| Barnstormers | 7 | 13 | 14 | 14 | 48 |

at Wells Fargo Arena, Des Moines, Iowa

- Date: May 21
- Game time: 8:05 pm EDT
- Game attendance: 9,912
- Referee: Brad Van Vark
- Recap

Game information

1st quarter

- Arizona – J.J. McKelvey 12-yard pass from Nick Davila (Jason Witczak kick), 10:53
- Iowa – Timothy Dodge 5-yard pass from Ryan Vena (Jeff Glas kick), 7:21
- Arizona – Nick Davila 1-yard run (Jason Witczak kick no good), 3:07

2nd quarter

- Arizona – Rod Windsor 4-yard pass from Nick Davila (Johnie Kirton run), 11:47
- Iowa – Jesse Schmidt 17-yard pass from Ryan Vena (Jeff Glas kick), 6:50
- Arizona – Jason Witczak 14-yard field goal, 0:53
- Iowa – Jesse Schmidt 17-yard pass from Ryan Vena (Jeff Glas kick blocked), 0:30
- Arizona – Rod Windsor 4-yard run (Jason Witczak kick), 0:07

3rd quarter

- Iowa – Todd Blythe 24-yard pass from Ryan Vena (Jeff Glas kick), 11:35
- Arizona – Anthony Mix 7-yard pass from Nick Davila (Jason Witczak kick), 8:16
- Iowa – Anthony Mix 7-yard pass from Nick Davila (Jason Witczak kick), 1:48

4th quarter

- Iowa – Ryan Vena 1-yard run (Jeff Glas kick), 10:45
- Arizona – Terrance Sanders 56-yard kickoff return (Jason Witczak kick), 10:11
- Iowa – Tommy Ellingworth 20-yard pass from Ryan Vena (Jeff Glas kick), 7:46
- Arizona – J.J. McKelvey 6-yard pass from Nick Davila (Jason Witczak kick), 4:00

Passing

- Arizona – Nick Davila: 23/34, 222 yards, 4 TD
- Iowa – Ryan Vena: 20/32, 208 yards, 6 TD, 1 INT

Rushing

- Arizona – Johnie Kirton: 7 att, 27 yards
- Iowa – Ryan Vena: 5 att, 19 yards, 1 TD

Receiving

- Arizona – J.J. McKelvey: 12 rec, 131 yards, 2 TD
- Iowa – Jesse Schmidt: 8 rec, 92 yards, 2 TD

=== Week 9: at Utah Blaze ===
| Quarter | 1 | 2 | 3 | 4 | Total |
|---|---|---|---|---|---|
| Rattlers | 27 | 21 | 14 | 21 | 83 |
| Blaze | 14 | 25 | 13 | 6 | 58 |

at E Center, West Valley City, Utah

- Date: May 29
- Game time: 9:05 pm EDT
- Game attendance: 8,501
- Referee: Steve Strimling
- Recap

Game information

1st quarter

- Arizona – Trandon Harvey 38-yard pass from Nick Davila (Fabrizio Scaccia kick), 13:51
- Utah – Aaron Boone 32-yard pass from Michael Affleck (Ben Scott kick), 10:45
- Arizona – Rod Windsor 12-yard pass from Nick Davila (Fabrizio Scaccia kick), 9:24
- Utah – Aaron Boone 42-yard pass from Michael Affleck (Ben Scott kick), 6:13
- Arizona – John Booker 1-yard run (Fabrizio Scaccia kick), 3:02

2nd quarter

- Utah – Ben Scott 17-yard field goal, 13:45
- Utah – Caesar Rayford 30-yard fumble return (Ben Scott kick), 11:25
- Arizona – Trandon Harvey 22-yard pass from Nick Davila (Fabrizio Scaccia kick), 7:36
- Arizona – Rod Windsor 14-yard pass from Nick Davila (Fabrizio Scaccia kick), 5:58
- Utah – Aaron Boone 14-yard pass from Michael Affleck (Michael Affleck run), 4:14
- Utah – Caesar Rayford 16-yard interception return (Ben Scott kick), 2:33
- Arizona – J.J. McKelvey 9-yard pass from Nick Davila (Fabrizio Scaccia kick no good), 0:12
- Arizona – Marcus Pittman 0-yard fumble return (Fabrizio Scaccia kick), 0:00

3rd quarter

- Utah – Michael Affleck 1-yard run (Ben Scott kick no good), 13:07
- Arizona – Rod Windsor 10-yard pass from Nick Davila (Fabrizio Scaccia kick), 10:13
- Arizona – Rod Windsor 7-yard pass from Nick Davila (Fabrizio Scaccia kick), 5:11
- Utah – Caesar Rayford 30-yard interception return (Ben Scott kick), 0:41

4th quarter

- Arizona – John Booker 4-yard pass from Nick Davila (Fabrizio Scaccia kick), 11:29
- Arizona – Rod Windsor 25-yard pass from Nick Davila (Fabrizio Scaccia kick), 5:23
- Arizona – Rod Windsor 15-yard pass from Billy Farris (Fabrizio Scaccia kick), 1:00
- Utah – Aaron Boone 30-yard pass from Michael Affleck (Ben Scott kick no good), 0:54

Passing

- Arizona – Nick Davila: 28/37, 335 yards, 9 TD, 2 INT
- Utah – Michael Affleck: 14/25, 242 yards, 4 TD

Rushing

- Arizona – John Booker: 4 att, 10 yards, 1 TD
- Utah – Damian Walker: 1 att, 3 yards

Receiving

- Arizona – Rod Windsor: 15 rec, 152 yards, 6 TD
- Utah – Aaron Boone: 7 rec, 161 yards, 4 TD

=== Week 10: vs. Milwaukee Iron ===
| Quarter | 1 | 2 | 3 | 4 | OT | Total |
|---|---|---|---|---|---|---|
| Iron | 6 | 24 | 13 | 17 | 7 | 67 |
| Rattlers | 13 | 21 | 7 | 19 | 8 | 68 |

at US Airways Center, Phoenix, Arizona

- Date: June 5
- Game time: 10:30 pm EDT
- Game attendance: 10,031
- Recap

Game information

1st quarter

- Arizona – Rod Windsor 1-yard run (Johnie Kirton run no good), 10:35
- Milwaukee – Anthony Jones 38-yard pass from Chris Greisen (Robert Forstrom kick no good), 8:49
- Arizona – Rod Windsor 1-yard run (Fabrizio Scaccia kick), 2:48

2nd quarter

- Arizona – J.J. McKelvey 9-yard pass from Nick Davila (Fabrizio Scaccia kick), 11:00
- Milwaukee – Nate Forse 41-yard pass from Chris Greisen (Robert Forstrom kick), 9:10
- Milwaukee – Nate Forse 10-yard pass from Chris Greisen (Robert Forstrom kick), 4:59
- Arizona – Rod Windsor 12-yard pass from Nick Davila (Fabrizio Scaccia kick), 0:56
- Milwaukee – Tyre Young 49-yard run (Robert Forstrom kick), 0:37
- Arizona – Rod Windsor 15-yard pass from Nick Davila (Fabrizio Scaccia kick), 0:10
- Milwaukee – Robert Forstrom 35-yard field goal, 0:00

3rd quarter

- Milwaukee – Damian Harrell 17-yard pass from Chris Greisen (Robert Forstrom kick no good), 13:18
- Milwaukee – Anthony Jones 19-yard pass from Chris Greisen (Robert Forstrom kick), 6:30
- Arizona – J.J. McKelvey 14-yard pass from Nick Davila (Fabrizio Scaccia kick), 2:27

4th quarter

- Milwaukee – Nate Forse 2-yard pass from Chris Greisen (Robert Forstrom kick), 14:55
- Arizona – J.J. McKelvey 21-yard pass from Nick Davila (Billy Farris run no good), 11:19
- Milwaukee – Anthony Jones 4-yard pass from Chris Greisen (Robert Forstrom kick), 9:00
- Arizona – J.J. McKelvey 5-yard pass from Nick Davila (Fabrizio Scaccia kick), 4:12
- Arizona – J.J. McKelvey 31-yard pass from Nick Davila (Fabrizio Scaccia kick no good), 1:00
- Milwaukee – Robert Forstrom 20-yard field goal, 0:00

Overtime

- Milwaukee – Nate Forse 7-yard pass from Chris Greisen (Robert Forstrom kick), 9:23
- Arizona – Rod Windsor 11-yard pass from Nick Davila (Rod Windsor run)

Passing

- Milwaukee – Chris Greisen: 24/36, 397 yards, 8 TD, 3 INT
- Arizona – Nick Davila: 37/52, 420 yards, 8 TD, 2 INT

Rushing

- Milwaukee – Anthony Jones: 1 att, 6 yards
- Arizona – Rod Windsor: 2 att, 2 yards, 2 TD

Receiving

- Milwaukee – Anthony Jones: 7 rec, 156 yards, 3 TD
- Arizona – J.J. McKelvey: 14 rec, 186 yards, 5 TD

=== Week 11: vs. Oklahoma City Yard Dawgz ===
| Quarter | 1 | 2 | 3 | 4 | Total |
|---|---|---|---|---|---|
| Yard Dawgz | 13 | 16 | 6 | 20 | 55 |
| Rattlers | 7 | 21 | 7 | 21 | 56 |

at US Airways Center, Phoenix, Arizona

- Date: June 11
- Game time: 10:30 pm EDT
- Game attendance: 10,115
- Referee: Shawn Hocholi
- Recap

=== Week 12: vs. Bossier–Shreveport Battle Wings ===
| Quarter | 1 | 2 | 3 | 4 | Total |
|---|---|---|---|---|---|
| Battle Wings | 7 | 28 | 7 | 8 | 50 |
| Rattlers | 23 | 21 | 14 | 21 | 79 |

at US Airways Center, Phoenix, Arizona

- Date: June 19
- Game time: 10:30 pm EDT
- Game attendance: 10,217
- Referee: Shawn Hochuli
- Recap

Game information

1st quarter

- Arizona – Windsor 37-yard pass from Nick Davila (Fabrizio Scaccia kick), 13:46
- Arizona – Safety, 13:12
- Arizona – Tod Devoe 28-yard pass from Nick Davila (Fabrizio Scaccia kick), 10:25
- Bossier–Shreveport – Willis Marshall 30-yard pass from Gary Cooper (Nick Gatto kick), 5:22
- Arizona – J.J. McKelvey 27-yard pass from Nick Davila (Fabrizio Scaccia kick), 3:45

2nd quarter

- Bossier–Shreveport – James Jordan 8-yard pass from Gary Cooper (Nick Gatto kick)
- Bossier–Shreveport – Christian Wise 9-yard pass from Gary Cooper (Nick Gatto kick), 12:39
- Arizona – Rod Windsor 30-yard pass from Nick Davila (Fabrizio Scaccia kick no good), 9:18
- Bossier–Shreveport – Willis Marshall 38-yard pass from Gary Cooper (Nick Gatto kick), 7:31
- Arizona – Rod Windsor 29-yard pass from Nick Davila (Fabrizio Scaccia kick), 4:50
- Arizona – J.J. McKelvey 10-yard pass from Nick Davila (Billy Farris run), 1:25
- Bossier–Shreveport – P.J. Berry 19-yard pass from Gary Cooper (Nick Gatto kick), 0:24

3rd quarter

- Bossier–Shreveport – P.J. Berry 13-yard pass from Gary Cooper (Nick Gatto kick), 10:41
- Arizona – J.J. McKelvey 27-yard pass from Nick Davila (Fabrizio Scaccia kick), 8:58
- Arizona – Rod Windsor 9-yard pass from Nick Davila (Fabrizio Scaccia kick), 1:45

4th quarter

- Arizona – Rod Windsor 9-yard pass from Nick Davila (Fabrizio Scaccia kick), 14:55
- Bossier–Shreveport – P.J. Berry 1-yard pass from Gary Cooper (James Jordan pass), 10:52
- Arizona – Rod Windsor 15-yard pass from Billy Farris (Fabrizio Scaccia kick), 8:52
- Arizona – Rod Windsor 7-yard pass from Billy Farris (Fabrizio Scaccia kick), 3:49

Passing

- Bossier–Shreveport – Gary Cooper: 23/39, 264 yards, 7 TD, 1 INT
- Arizona – Nick Davila: 20/26, 319 yards, 9 TD

Rushing

- Bossier–Shreveport – Byron Douzart: 3 att, 5 yards
- Arizona – John Booker: 4 att, 6 yards

Receiving

- Bossier–Shreveport – Willis Marshall: 6 rec, 115 yards, 2 TD
- Arizona – Rod Windsor: 10 rec, 157 yards, 7 TD

=== Week 13: at Jacksonville Sharks ===
| Quarter | 1 | 2 | 3 | 4 | Total |
|---|---|---|---|---|---|
| Rattlers | 14 | 10 | 21 | 21 | 66 |
| Sharks | 0 | 10 | 14 | 26 | 50 |

at Jacksonville Veterans Memorial Arena, Jacksonville, Florida

- Date: June 26
- Game time: 7:05 pm EDT
- Recap

=== Week 14: at Spokane Shock ===
| Quarter | 1 | 2 | 3 | 4 | Total |
|---|---|---|---|---|---|
| Rattlers | 7 | 14 | 7 | 8 | 36 |
| Shock | 7 | 20 | 3 | 7 | 37 |

at Spokane Veterans Memorial Arena, Spokane, Washington

- Date: July 2
- Game time: 10:00 pm EDT
- Recap

=== Week 15: at Chicago Rush ===
| Quarter | 1 | 2 | 3 | 4 | Total |
|---|---|---|---|---|---|
| Rattlers | 7 | 21 | 7 | 15 | 50 |
| Rush | 21 | 21 | 10 | 3 | 55 |

at Allstate Arena, Rosemont, Illinois

- Date: July 10
- Game time: 8:00 pm EDT
- Game attendance: 8,452
- Referee: Tom McCabe
- Recap

Game information

1st quarter

- Chicago – Syvelle Newton 27-yard pass from Russ Michna (Chris Gould kick), 12:38
- Arizona – Rod Windsor 3-yard run (Fabrizio Scaccia kick), 8:28
- Chicago – Marco Thomas 18-yard pass from Russ Michna (Chris Gould kick), 3:46
- Chicago – Chris Martin 12-yard interception return (Chris Gould kick), 2:28

2nd quarter

- Arizona – Trandon Harvey 29-yard pass from Nick Davila (Fabrizio Scaccia kick), 14:16
- Chicago – Clifton Smith 2-yard run (Chris Gould kick), 7:49
- Arizona – J.J. McKelvey 3-yard pass from Rod Windsor (Fabrizio Scaccia kick), 5:21
- Chicago – Syvelle Newton 7-yard pass from Russ Michna (Chris Gould kick), 1:00
- Arizona – Trandon Harvey 15-yard pass from Nick Davila (Fabrizio Scaccia kick), 0:40
- Chicago – Syvelle Newton 39-yard pass from Russ Michna (Chris Gould kick), 0:06

3rd quarter

- Arizona – J.J. McKelvey 6-yard pass from Nick Davila (Fabrizio Scaccia kick), 10:41
- Chicago – Chris Gould 18-yard field goal
- Chicago – Syvelle Newton 21-yard pass from Russ Michna (Chris Gould kick), 0:00

4th quarter

- Arizona – Rod Windsor 9-yard pass from Nick Davila (Fabrizio Scaccia kick), 10:01
- Chicago – Chris Gould 14-yard field goal, 7:41
- Arizona – Rod Windsor 28-yard pass from Nick Davila (Rod Windsor pass), 0:26

Passing

- Arizona – Nick Davila: 27/48, 343 yards, 5 TD, 3 INT
- Chicago – Russ Michna: 28/38, 321 yards, 5 TD, 1 INT

Rushing

- Arizona – Rod Windsor: 1 att, 3 yards, 1 TD
- Chicago – Syvelle Newton: 2 att, 10 yards

Receiving

- Arizona – Rod Windsor: 15 rec, 179 yards, 2 TD
- Chicago – Marco Thomas: 13 rec, 147 yards, 1 TD

=== Week 16: vs. Utah Blaze ===
| Quarter | 1 | 2 | 3 | 4 | Total |
|---|---|---|---|---|---|
| Blaze | 3 | 7 | 3 | 7 | 20 |
| Rattlers | 0 | 34 | 7 | 7 | 48 |

at US Airways Center, Phoenix, Arizona

- Date: July 16
- Game time: 10:30 pm EDT
- Game attendance: 10,317
- Referee: Shawn Hochuli
- Recap

Game information

1st quarter

- Utah – Ben Scott 18-yard field goal, 5:33

2nd quarter

- Arizona – J.J. McKelvey 7-yard pass from Nick Davila (Fabrizio Scaccia kick), 13:41
- Arizona – Rod Windsor 11-yard pass from Nick Davila (Fabrizio Scaccia kick), 11:08
- Utah – Chris Francies 17-yard pass from Brett Elliott (Ben Scott kick), 5:38
- Arizona – Rod Windsor 47-yard pass from Nick Davila (Fabrizio Scaccia kick), 4:36
- Arizona – Trandon Harvey 9-yard pass from Nick Davila (Fabrizio Scaccia kick), 0:14
- Arizona – Anttaj Hawthorne 0-yard fumble return (Fabrizio Scaccia kick no good), 0:00

3rd quarter

- Utah – Ben Scott 34-yard field goal
- Arizona – Trandon Harvey 12-yard pass from Nick Davila (Fabrizio Scaccia kick), 3:22

4th quarter

- Arizona – J.J. McKelvey 7-yard pass from Billy Farris (Fabrizio Scaccia kick), 7:27
- Utah – Aaron Boone 3-yard pass from Brett Elliott (Ben Scott kick), 2:04

Passing

- Utah – Brett Elliott: 16/34, 145 yards, 2 TD, 1 INT
- Arizona – Nick Davila: 14/19, 199 yards, 5 TD

Rushing

- Utah – Damian Walker: 4 att, 4 yards
- Arizona – Alex Guerrero: 3 att, 19 yards

Receiving

- Utah – Chris Francies: 4 rec, 64 yards, 1 TD
- Arizona – Rod Windsor: 8 rec, 136 yards, 2 TD

The win, coupled with a loss by the Iowa Barnstormers, clinched a playoff berth for the Rattlers.

=== Week 17: at Tulsa Talons ===
| Quarter | 1 | 2 | 3 | 4 | Total |
|---|---|---|---|---|---|
| Rattlers | 13 | 13 | 14 | 21 | 61 |
| Talons | 13 | 17 | 14 | 7 | 51 |

at BOK Center, Tulsa, Oklahoma

- Date: July 24
- Game time: 8:00 pm EDT
- Recap

Game information

1st quarter

- Tulsa – Donovan Morgan 4-yard pass from Justin Allgood (Marco Capozzoli kick no good), 12:41
- Arizona – J.J. McKelvey 5-yard pass from Nick Davila (Fabrizio Scaccia run no good), 7:12
- Tulsa – Carlese Franklin 11-yard pass from Justin Allgood (Marco Capozzoli kick), 4:07
- Arizona – J.J. McKelvey 7-yard pass from Nick Davila (Fabrizio Scaccia kick), 0:54

2nd quarter

- Tulsa – Marco Capozzoli 22-yard field goal, 11:08
- Arizona – Trandon Harvey 39-yard pass from Nick Davila (Fabrizio Scaccia kick), 9:28
- Tulsa – Jeff Hughley 6-yard pass from Justin Allgood (Marco Capozzoli kick), 5:07
- Arizona – Johnie Kirton 1-yard run (Billy Farris run no good), 1:00
- Tulsa – Donovan Morgan 1-yard pass from Justin Allgood (Marco Capozzoli kick), 0:38

3rd quarter

- Tulsa – Justin Allgood 2-yard run (Marco Capozzoli kick), 10:41
- Arizona – Rod Windsor 40-yard pass from Nick Davila (Billy Farris run), 9:32
- Arizona – Kelvin Morris 50-yard fumble return (Fabrizio Scaccia kick no good), 6:47
- Tulsa – Carlese Franklin 14-yard pass from Justin Allgood (Marco Capozzoli kick), 1:44

4th quarter

- Arizona – J.J. McKelvey 8-yard pass from Nick Davila (Fabrizio Scaccia kick), 10:16
- Arizona – Rod Windsor 3-yard pass from Nick Davila (Fabrizio Scaccia kick), 6:09
- Tulsa – Jamar Ransom 1-yard run (Marco Capozzoli kick), 2:11
- Arizona – Rod Windsor 21-yard pass from Nick Davila (Fabrizio Scaccia kick), 0:49

Passing

- Arizona – Nick Davila: 25/36, 296 yards, 7 TD, 2 INT
- Tulsa – Justin Allgood: 20/36, 181 yards, 5 TD, 1 INT

Rushing

- Arizona – Johnie Kirton: 2 att, 0 yards, 1 TD
- Tulsa – Justin Allgood: 4 att, 40 yards, 1 TD

Receiving

- Arizona – J.J. McKelvey: 14 rec, 127 yards, 3 TD
- Tulsa – Carlese Franklin: 6 rec, 89 yards, 2 TD

=== Week 18: vs. Iowa Barnstormers ===
| Quarter | 1 | 2 | 3 | 4 | Total |
|---|---|---|---|---|---|
| Barnstormers | 13 | 16 | 7 | 31 | 67 |
| Rattlers | 14 | 13 | 7 | 13 | 47 |

at US Airways Center, Phoenix, Arizona

- Date: July 31
- Game time: 10:30 pm EDT
- Game attendance: 10,420
- Referee: Shawn Hochuli
- Recap

== Playoffs ==
=== National Conference semifinals: at Spokane Shock ===
| Quarter | 1 | 2 | 3 | 4 | Total |
|---|---|---|---|---|---|
| Rattlers | 7 | 13 | 7 | 22 | 49 |
| Shock | 7 | 23 | 14 | 13 | 57 |

at Spokane Veterans Memorial Arena, Spokane, Washington

- Date: August 6
- Game time: 11:00 pm EDT
- Game attendance: 8,236
- Referee: Steve Strimling
- Recap

Game information

1st quarter

- Spokane – Markee White 6-yard pass from Kyle Rowley (Taylor Rowan kick), 8:48
- Arizona – Rod Windsor 27-yard pass from Nick Davila (Fabrizio Scaccia kick), 5:18

2nd quarter

- Spokane – Ed Ta'amu 6-yard pass from Kyle Rowley (Taylor Rowan kick no good), 9:16
- Arizona – Nick Davila 1-yard run (Fabrizio Scaccia kick), 4:44
- Spokane – Greg Orton 4-yard pass from Kyle Rowley (Taylor Rowan kick), 1:34
- Spokane – Huey Whittaker 3-yard pass from Kyle Rowley (Taylor Rowan kick), 0:31
- Arizona – Trandon Harvey 7-yard pass from Nick Davila (Fabrizio Scaccia kick no good)
- Spokane – Taylor Rowan 40-yard field goal, 0:00

3rd quarter

- Arizona – Rod Windsor 26-yard pass from Nick Davila (Fabrizio Scaccia kick), 14:05
- Spokane – Huey Whittaker 1-yard run (Taylor Rowan kick), 9:44
- Spokane – Huey Whittaker 21-yard pass from Kyle Rowley (Taylor Rowan kick), 1:01

4th quarter

- Arizona – Rod Windsor 6-yard pass from Nick Davila (Johnie Kirton run), 13:44
- Spokane – Markee White 3-yard pass from Kyle Rowley (Kyle Rowley run no good), 11:21
- Arizona – Rod Windsor 5-yard pass from Nick Davila (Fabrizio Scaccia kick), 8:15
- Spokane – Greg Orton 8-yard pass from Kyle Rowley (Taylor Rowan kick), 7:03
- Arizona – Rod Windsor 19-yard pass from Nick Davila (Fabrizio Scaccia kick), 4:43

Passing

- Arizona – Nick Davila: 25/43, 315 yards, 6 TD, 1 INT
- Spokane – Kyle Rowley: 25/37, 160 yards, 7 TD

Rushing

- Arizona – Nick Davila: 1 att, 1 yard, 1 TD
- Spokane – Kyle Rowley: 4 att, 21 yards

Receiving

- Arizona – Rod Windsor: 15 rec, 210 yards, 5 TD
- Spokane – Markee White: 10 rec, 66 yards, 2 TD
