= 2010 Utah Blaze season =

- Head coach: Ernesto Purnsley (fired June 1); Ron James
- Home stadium: Maverik Center

Results
- Record: 2–14
- Division place: 3rd NC West
- Playoffs: did not qualify

The 2010 Utah Blaze season is the 4th season for the franchise in the Arena Football League. The team was coached by Ernesto Purnsley, who was fired on June 1, 2010, with Ron James named as his replacement. Home games are played at the Maverik Center, which was known as the "E Center" prior to being renamed on June 8, 2010. The Blaze missed out on the postseason after finishing the season 2–14, the worst record in the league.

== Standings ==
West Division
Team	W	L	PCT	PF	PA	DIV	CON	Home	Away
z-Spokane Shock	13	3	.812	988	843	4–0	8–2	6–2	7–1
x-Arizona Rattlers	10	6	.625	987	885	2–2	5–5	5–3	5–3
Utah Blaze	2	14	.125	742	1040	0–4	0–10	1–7	1–7

z - Clinched division and conference's best record
x - Clinched playoff berth

== Regular season schedule ==
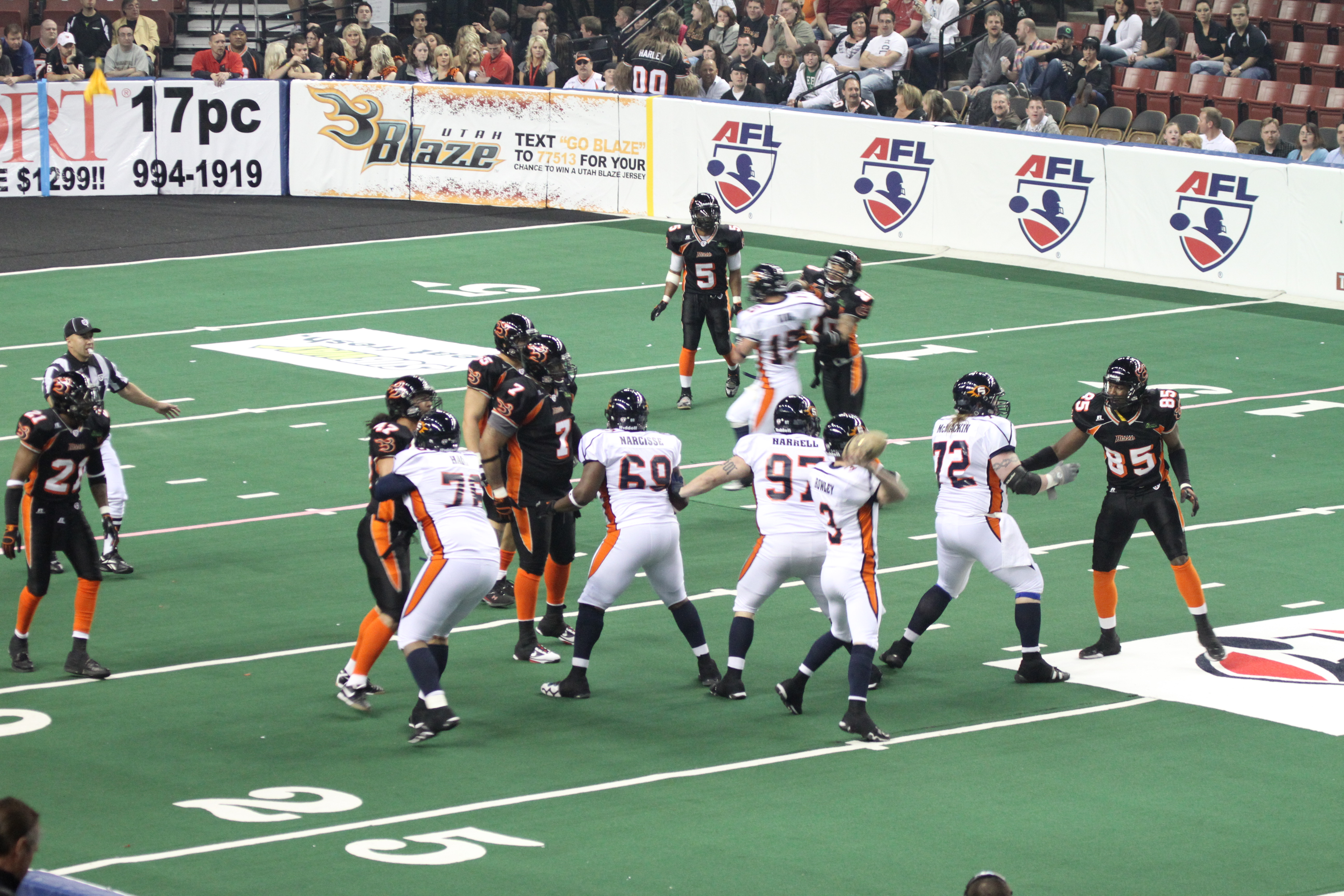
The Blaze playing the Spokane Shock on April 9

The Blaze did not open their season in the league's opening week, but instead in Week 2 at home against the Shock on April 9. They visited the Vipers on July 31 for their final regular season game.

Week	Day	Date	Kickoff	Opponent	Results		Stadium	Report
Week	Day	Date	Kickoff	Opponent	Score	Record	Stadium	Report
1	Bye							
2	Friday	April 9	9:05 pm	Spokane Shock	L 34–68	0–1	E Center	^{[usurped]}
3	Saturday	April 17	9:05 pm	Alabama Vipers	L 54–63	0–2	E Center	^{[usurped]}
4	Friday	April 23	8:00 pm	at Chicago Rush	L 40–63	0–3	Allstate Arena	
5	Friday	April 30	9:05 pm	Bossier–Shreveport Battle Wings	W 65–46	1–3	E Center	^{[usurped]}
6	Bye							
7	Saturday	May 22	10:00 pm	at Milwaukee Iron	L 55–56 (OT)	1–4	Bradley Center	
8	Saturday	May 22	10:00 pm	at Spokane Shock	L 28–77	1–5	Spokane Veterans Memorial Arena	^{[usurped]}
9	Saturday	May 29	9:05 pm	Arizona Rattlers	L 58–83	1–6	E Center	
10	Friday	June 4	7:30 pm	at Cleveland Gladiators	L 29–75	1–7	Quicken Loans Arena	
11	Saturday	June 12	9:05 pm	Chicago Rush	L 50–70	1–8	Maverik Center	
12	Saturday	June 19	9:05 pm	Tampa Bay Storm	L 45–60	1–9	Maverik Center	
13	Saturday	June 26	8:05 pm	at Iowa Barnstormers	L 32–68	1–10	Wells Fargo Arena	
14	Saturday	July 3	7:00 pm	Milwaukee Iron	L 56–82	1–11	Maverik Center	
15	Saturday	July 10	9:05 pm	Jacksonville Sharks	L 56–67	1–12	Maverik Center	
16	Friday	July 16	10:30 pm	at Arizona Rattlers	L 20–48	1–13	US Airways Center	
17	Friday	July 23	8:30 pm	at Dallas Vigilantes	W 51–41	2–13	American Airlines Center	
18	Saturday	July 31	8:30 pm	at Alabama Vipers	L 64–68	2–14	Von Braun Center	

All times are EDT

== Final roster ==
2010 Utah Blaze roster
Quarterbacks: 4 Brett Elliott; 16 Mark Thorson; Fullbacks: 33 Damian Walker; Wide receivers: 1 Aaron Boone; 80 Chris Francies; 22 Aaron Lesué; 15 Wendall Williams	Offensive linemen: 69 Jason Boone; Defensive linemen: 55 Vaka Manupuna; 85 Caesar Rayford; 10 Garrett Smith; 47 Chris Solomona	Linebackers: 42 Jermaine Younger; Defensive backs: 8 LaBrose Hedgemon; 20 Antonio Malone; 21 Olukayode Oredugba; 31 Justin Phinisee; 6 Brandon Taylor; Kickers: 9 Ben Scott	Injured reserve: 2 Akamu Aki WR (IR); Other league exempt: Currently vacant; Refuse to report: Currently vacant; Inactive reserve: Currently vacant; League suspension: Currently vacant; Team suspension: Currently vacant; Recallable reassignment: Currently vacant; Rookies in italics Roster updated July 29, 2010; 19 Active, 1 Inactive

== Regular season ==
=== Week 2: vs. Spokane Shock ===
Quarter	1	2	3	4	Total
Shock	14	21	20	13	68
Blaze	7	7	6	14	34

at E Center, West Valley City, Utah

- Date: April 9
- Game time: 9:05 pm EDT
- Game attendance: 5,032
- Referee: Steve Strimling
- Recap^{[usurped]}

Game information

1st quarter

- Spokane – Eddie Thompson 3-yard run (Taylor Rowan kick), 11:06
- Spokane – Huey Whittaker 17-yard pass from Kyle Rowley (Taylor Rowan kick), 5:27
- Utah – Brandon Hampton 54-yard kickoff return (Kenny Byrd kick), 4:45

2nd quarter

- Spokane – Raul Vijil 11-yard pass from Kyle Rowley (Taylor Rowan kick no good), 13:43
- Utah – Brandon Hampton 56-yard kickoff return (Kenny Byrd kick), 12:55
- Spokane – Markee White 14-yard pass from Kyle Rowley (Markee White pass), 8:55
- Spokane – Kyle Rowley 1-yard run (Taylor Rowan kick), 0:29

3rd quarter

- Spokane – Raul Vijil 27-yard pass from Kyle Rowley (Taylor Rowan kick), 12:04
- Spokane – Raul Vijil 21-yard pass from Kyle Rowley (Taylor Rowan kick), 9:32
- Utah – Aaron Boone 3-yard pass from Brett Elliot (Kenny Byrd kick no good), 2:23
- Spokane – Markee White 31-yard pass from Kyle Rowley (Taylor Rowan kick no good), 0:20

4th quarter

- Utah – Aaron Boone 9-yard pass from Brett Elliot (Kenny Byrd kick no good), 13:34
- Spokane – Raul Vijil 56-yard kickoff return (Taylor Rowan kick), 12:35
- Utah – Wendall Williams 8-yard run (Aaron Boone pass), 10:56
- Spokane – Huey Whittaker 1-yard pass from Erik Meyer (Taylor Rowan kick no good), 0:07

Passing

- Spokane – Kyle Rowley: 21/29, 224 yards, 6 TD
- Utah – Brett Elliot: 10/17, 122 yards, 2 TD

Rushing

- Spokane – Kyle Rowley: 2 att, 7 yards, 1 TD
- Utah –Wendall Williams: 1 att, 8 yards, 1 TD

Receiving

- Spokane – Markee White: 8 rec, 118 yards, 2 TD
- Utah – Aaron Boone: 8 rec, 90 yards, 2 TD

The Blaze did not open the season well, never scoring more than twice in any quarter during the game. Quarterback Michael Affleck completed only 4 passes for 42 yards by halftime. At halftime the Blaze trailed 35–14. Brett Elliott replaced Affleck at the start of the 3rd quarter. Elliott fared slightly better, completing 10 of 17 passes for 122 yards and 2 touchdowns, but it was not enough to get the Blaze back into the game, as they lost to the former AF2 team by 34 points.

=== Week 3: vs. Alabama Vipers ===
Quarter	1	2	3	4	Total
Vipers	21	14	14	14	63
Blaze	19	13	14	8	54

at E Center, West Valley City, Utah

- Date: April 17
- Game time: 9:05 pm EDT
- Game attendance: 4,898
- Referee: Steve Strimling
- Recap^{[usurped]}

Game information

1st quarter

- Utah – Brandon Hampton 46-yard interception return (Kenny Byrd kick no good), 13:02
- Alabama – Larry Shipp 14-yard pass from Kevin Eakin (Brian Jackson kick), 9:56
- Utah – Brandon Hampton 55-yard kickoff return (Kenny Byrd kick), 9:03
- Alabama – Larry Shipp 33-yard pass from Kevin Eakin (Brian Jackson kick), 4:45
- Utah – Mickey Pimentel 1-yard run (Kenny Byrd kick no good), 1:09
- Alabama – Larry Shipp 45-yard pass from Kevin Eakin (Brian Jackson kick), 0:00

2nd quarter

- Utah – Chris Francies 8-yard pass from Brett Elliott (Kenny Byrd kick no good), 11:47
- Alabama – Dan Alexander 3-yard run (Brian Jackson kick), 9:09
- Utah – Mickey Pimentel 1-yard run (Kenny Byrd kick), 5:30
- Alabama – Dan Alexander 4-yard run (Brian Jackson kick), 2:17

3rd quarter

- Utah – Aaron Boone 7-yard pass from Brett Elliott (Kenny Byrd kick no good), 9:52
- Alabama – Larry Shipp 43-yard pass from Kevin Eakin (Brian Jackson kick), 8:44
- Alabama – Dan Alexander 1-yard run (Brian Jackson kick), 1:30
- Utah – Wendall Williams 36-yard pass from Brett Elliott (Aaron Boone pass), 0:00

4th quarter

- Alabama – Michael Johnson 20-yard pass from Kevin Eakin (Brian Jackson kick), 12:19
- Alabama – Dan Alexander 6-yard run (Brian Jackson kick), 0:51
- Utah – Aaron Boone 13-yard pass from Brett Elliott (Aaron Boone pass), 0:40

Passing

- Alabama – Kevin Eakin: 21/31, 375 yards, 5 TD, 1 INT
- Utah – Brett Elliott: 21/38, 231 yards, 4 TD, 1 INT

Rushing

- Alabama – Dan Alexander: 13 att, 45 yards, 4 TD
- Utah – Mickey Pimentel: 5 att, 5 yards, 2 TD

Receiving

- Alabama – Larry Shipp: 8 rec, 199 yards, 4 TD
- Utah – Wendall Williams: 7 rec, 90 yards, 1 TD

Utah came up short in a game that featured several lead changes. Both teams exchanged touchdowns until the Vipers had consecutive scores in the 3rd quarter. The Blaze were able to cut the deficit to 49–46 going into the 4th quarter, but did not score again until the final minute of the game. By that time, the game out of reach, and the Blaze dropped to 0–2. Brett Elliott, who came into the previous week's game after halftime, got the start in this game, throwing for 231 yards and 4 touchdowns. None of Utah's receivers caught for over 100 yards.

=== Week 4: at Chicago Rush ===
Quarter	1	2	3	4	Total
Blaze	7	7	13	13	40
Rush	14	14	14	21	63

at Allstate Arena, Rosemont, Illinois

- Date: April 23
- Game time: 8:00 pm EDT
- Game attendance: 7,459
- Referee: Tom McCabe
- Recap

Game information

1st quarter

- Utah – Aaron Boone 4-yard pass from Brett Elliott (Ben Scott kick), 10:46
- Chicago – Samie Parker 34-yard pass from Russ Michna (Chris Gould kick), 9:29
- Chicago – Clifton Smith 1-yard run (Chris Gould kick), 0:00

2nd quarter

- Chicago – Nichiren Flowers 29-yard pass from Russ Michna (Chris Gould kick), 8:10
- Utah – Chris Francies 25-yard pass from Brett Elliott (Ben Scott kick), 0:16
- Chicago – Allen Turner 24-yard pass from Russ Michna (Chris Gould kick), 0:04

3rd quarter

- Chicago – Allen Turner 3-yard run (Chris Gould kick), 11:45
- Utah – Aaron Boone 10-yard pass from Brett Elliott (Ben Scott kick no good), 10:43
- Chicago – Nichiren Flowers 5-yard pass from Russ Michna (Chris Gould kick), 5:27
- Utah – Chris Francies 24-yard pass from Brett Elliott (Ben Scott kick), 3:08

4th quarter

- Chicago – Allen Turner 13-yard pass from Russ Michna (Chris Gould kick), 14:13
- Utah – Aaron Boone 2-yard pass from Brett Elliott (Aaron Boone pass no good), 7:45
- Chicago – Nichiren Flowers 34-yard pass from Russ Michna (Chris Gould kick), 4:28
- Utah – Tyler Clutts 2-yard run (Ben Scott kick), 0:55
- Chicago – Russ Michna 4-yard run (Chris Gould kick), 0:06

Passing

- Utah – Brett Elliott: 31/44, 316 yards, 5 TD, 1 INT
- Chicago – Russ Michna: 21/30, 326 yards, 6 TD

Rushing

- Utah – Tyler Clutts: 2 att, 2 yards, 1 TD
- Chicago – Samie Parker: 1 att, 6 yards

Receiving

- Utah – Chris Francies: 12 rec, 155 yards, 2 TD
- Chicago – Nichiren Flowers: 9 rec, 129 yards, 3 TD

The Blaze remained winless after being defeated by the undefeated Rush. Utah was the first to score in the game, but it was their only lead of the night. The Rush answered with a 34-yard touchdown pass to tie, and took the lead on a 1-yard run following a blocked field goal attempt by Utah. At halftime, the Blaze trailed 28–14. In the 3rd quarter, after an onside kick by the Rush following another touchdown went out of bounds, the Blaze scored a touchdown on the very next play, cutting the deficit to 35–20, but it was the closest they would get to Chicago, eventually losing by a final score of 63–40. Brett Elliott finished with 316 passing yards and 5 touchdowns. Chris Francies was the leading receiver with 129 yards on 9 receptions and 3 touchdowns.

=== Week 5: vs. Bossier–Shreveport Battle Wings ===
Quarter	1	2	3	4	Total
Battle Wings	14	6	13	13	46
Blaze	10	14	20	21	65

at E Center, West Valley City, Utah

- Date: April 30
- Game time: 9:05 pm EDT
- Game attendance: 4,256
- Recap^{[usurped]}

Game information

1st quarter

- Utah – Chris Francies 17-yard pass from Brett Elliott (Ben Scott kick), 12:16
- Bossier–Shreveport – Moqut Ruffins 18-yard pass from Raymond Philyaw (Art Carmody kick), 10:44
- Utah – Ben Scott 17-yard field goal, 6:12
- Bossier–Shreveport – P.J. Berry 5-yard pass from Raymond Philyaw (Art Carmody kick), 2:00

2nd quarter

- Utah – Aaron Boone 16-yard pass from Brett Elliott (Ben Scott kick), 14:20
- Bossier–Shreveport – Randy Hymes 7-yard pass from Raymond Philyaw (Art Carmody kick no good), 10:23
- Utah – Aaron Boone 4-yard pass from Brett Elliott (Ben Scott kick), 6:32

3rd quarter

- Utah – Wendall Williams 8-yard pass from Brett Elliott (Ben Scott kick no good), 11:55
- Bossier–Shreveport – P.J. Berry 7-yard pass from Raymond Philyaw (Art Carmody kick), 6:25
- Utah – Wendall Williams 9-yard pass from Brett Elliott (Ben Scott kick), 4:28
- Bossier–Shreveport – Kenyon Scott 23-yard pass from Raymond Philyaw (Art Carmody kick no good), 3:28
- Utah – Aaron Boone 6-yard pass from Brett Elliott (Ben Scott kick), 1:15

4th quarter

- Bossier–Shreveport – Byron Douzart 1-yard run (Raymond Philyaw run no good), 12:42
- Utah – Chris Francies 30-yard pass from Brett Elliott (Ben Scott kick), 5:18
- Utah – Brett Elliott 1-yard run (Ben Scott kick), 1:26
- Bossier–Shreveport – Randy Hymes 45-yard pass from Kinsmon Lancaster (Art Carmody kick no good), 0:52
- Utah – Chris Francies 9-yard kickoff return (Ben Scott kick), 0:50

Passing

- Bossier–Shreveport – Raymond Philyaw: 21/42, 229 yards, 5 TD, 1 INT
- Utah – Brett Elliott: 20/37, 237 yards, 7 TD

Rushing

- Bossier–Shreveport – Byron Douzart: 8 att, 49 yards, 1 TD
- Utah – Brett Elliott: 2 att, 4 yards, 1 TD

Receiving

- Bossier–Shreveport – Randy Hymes: 8 rec, 123 yards, 2 TD
- Utah – Chris Francies: 7 rec, 97 yards, 2 TD

The Blaze earned their first win of the year by defeating the Battle Wings, thanks in part to their defense. With a 24–20 lead in the 2nd quarter, Bossier–Shreveport looked to take the lead on what would be their last drive of the 1st half. Facing a 4th down just 2 yards away from the end zone, the Battle Wings got a new set of downs following a costly pass interference penalty by the Blaze defense. However Utah was able to keep the Battle Wings out of the end zone with a goal-line stand. Missing a field goal on the last play of the quarter, the score remained 24–20 at halftime. On the Battle Wings' first drive of the 3rd quarter, the Blaze came up with an interception, and the offense capitalized on the takeaway with a touchdown. The defense continued to come up with stops in the 4th quarter which allowed the offense to continue to build on its lead and secure the victory. Brett Elliott threw for 237 yards and had 8 total touchdowns in the game. With 97 yards and 2 touchdowns, Chris Francies was the leading receiver.

=== Week 7: at Milwaukee Iron ===
Quarter	1	2	3	4	OT	Total
Blaze	7	20	14	7	7	55
Iron	13	14	14	7	8	56

at Bradley Center, Milwaukee, Wisconsin

- Date: May 14
- Game time: 8:00 pm EDT
- Game attendance: 6,815
- Recap

Game information

1st quarter

- Milwaukee – Anthony Jones 25-yard pass from Chris Greisen (Robert Forstrom kick no good), 13:01
- Milwaukee – Nate Forse 27-yard pass from Chris Greisen (Robert Forstrom kick), 8:07
- Utah – Aaron Boone 11-yard pass from Brett Elliott (Ben Scott kick), 2:40

2nd quarter

- Milwaukee – Anthony Jones 16-yard pass from Chris Greisen (Robert Forstrom kick), 11:31
- Utah – Akamu Aki 32-yard pass from Brett Elliott (Ben Scott kick), 7:48
- Milwaukee – Damian Harrell 8-yard pass from Chris Greisen (Robert Forstrom kick), 3:15
- Utah – Aaron Boone 1-yard pass from Brett Elliott (Ben Scott kick no good), 0:37
- Utah – Aaron Boone 11-yard pass from Brett Elliott (Ben Scott kick), 0:03

3rd quarter

- Utah – Aaron Boone 12-yard pass from Brett Elliott (Ben Scott kick), 10:15
- Milwaukee – Tyre Young 3-yard run (Robert Forstrom kick), 6:30
- Utah – Aaron Boone 4-yard pass from Brett Elliott (Ben Scott kick), 3:05
- Milwaukee – Anthony Jones 50-yard pass from Chris Greisen (Robert Forstrom kick), 0:15

4th quarter

- Utah – Aaron Boone 3-yard pass from Brett Elliott (Ben Scott kick), 12:03
- Milwaukee – Anthony Jones 3-yard run (Robert Forstrom kick), 8:41

Overtime

- Utah – Aaron Boone 12-yard pass from Brett Elliott (Ben Scott kick), 13:46
- Milwaukee – Anthony Jones 43-yard pass from Chris Greisen (Nate Forse pass)

Passing

- Utah – Brett Elliott: 23/42, 273 yards, 8 TD, 2 INT
- Milwaukee – Chris Greisen: 21/34, 308 yards, 6 TD, 1 INT

Rushing

- Utah – Brett Elliott: 1 att, 6 yards
- Milwaukee – Tyre Young: 4 att, 8 yards, 1 TD

Receiving

- Utah – Akamu Aki: 6 rec, 111 yards, 1 TD
- Milwaukee – Anthony Jones: 7 rec, 119 yards, 4 TD

=== Week 8: at Spokane Shock ===
Quarter	1	2	3	4	Total
Blaze	16	0	6	6	28
Shock	14	35	7	21	77

at Spokane Veterans Memorial Arena, Spokane, Washington

- Date: May 22
- Game time: 10:00 pm EDT
- Game attendance: 10,481
- Referee: Shane Anderson
- Recap^{[usurped]}

Game information

1st quarter

- Spokane – Aaron Robbins 2-yard kickoff return (Taylor Rowan kick), 14:07
- Utah – Chris Francies 6-yard pass from Brett Elliott (Ben Scott kick no good), 11:04
- Spokane – Raul Vijil 37-yard pass from Kyle Rowley (Taylor Rowan kick), 9:23
- Utah – Chris Francies 21-yard pass from Brett Elliott (Ben Scott kick), 7:52
- Utah – Ben Scott 11-yard field goal, 4:50

2nd quarter

- Spokane – Harrison Nikolao 1-yard run (Taylor Rowan kick), 14:05
- Spokane – Huey Whittaker 3-yard pass from Kyle Rowley (Taylor Rowan kick), 11:32
- Spokane – Shaun Kauleinamoku 11-yard pass from Kyle Rowley (Taylor Rowan kick), 7:45
- Spokane – Raul Vijil 8-yard pass from Kyle Rowley (Taylor Rowan kick), 5:00
- Spokane – Raul Vijil 1-yard pass from Kyle Rowley (Taylor Rowan kick), 0:34

3rd quarter

- Spokane – Raul Vijil 31-yard pass from Erik Meyer (Taylor Rowan kick), 4:24
- Utah – Aaron Boone 1-yard pass from Michael Affleck (Aaron Boone pass no good), 0:12

4th quarter

- Spokane – Shaun Kauleinamoku 17-yard pass from Erik Meyer (Taylor Rowan kick), 10:12
- Spokane – Quorey Payne 28-yard pass from Erik Meyer (Taylor Rowan kick), 5:09
- Utah – Aaron Boone 1-yard pass from Michael Affleck (Aaron Boone pass no good), 2:51
- Spokane – Shaun Kauleinamoku 50-yard pass from Erik Meyer (Taylor Rowan kick), 1:00

Passing

- Utah – Brett Elliott: 6/11, 75 yards, 2 TD
- Spokane – Erik Meyer: 10/17, 197 yards, 4 TD, 1 INT

Rushing

- Utah – Brett Elliott: 1 att, 7 yards
- Spokane – Kyle Rowley: 1 att, 4 yards

Receiving

- Utah – Chris Francies: 4 rec, 44 yards, 2 TD
- Spokane – Raul Vijil: 8 rec, 160 yards, 4 TD

=== Week 9: vs. Arizona Rattlers ===
Quarter	1	2	3	4	Total
Rattlers	27	21	14	21	83
Blaze	14	25	13	6	58

at E Center, West Valley City, Utah

- Date: May 29
- Game time: 9:05 pm EDT
- Game attendance: 8,501
- Referee: Steve Strimling
- Recap

Game information

1st quarter

- Arizona – Trandon Harvey 38-yard pass from Nick Davila (Fabrizio Scaccia kick), 13:51
- Utah – Aaron Boone 32-yard pass from Michael Affleck (Ben Scott kick), 10:45
- Arizona – Rod Windsor 12-yard pass from Nick Davila (Fabrizio Scaccia kick), 9:24
- Utah – Aaron Boone 42-yard pass from Michael Affleck (Ben Scott kick), 6:13
- Arizona – John Booker 1-yard run (Fabrizio Scaccia kick), 3:02

2nd quarter

- Utah – Ben Scott 17-yard field goal, 13:45
- Utah – Caesar Rayford 30-yard fumble return (Ben Scott kick), 11:25
- Arizona – Trandon Harvey 22-yard pass from Nick Davila (Fabrizio Scaccia kick), 7:36
- Arizona – Rod Windsor 14-yard pass from Nick Davila (Fabrizio Scaccia kick), 5:58
- Utah – Aaron Boone 14-yard pass from Michael Affleck (Michael Affleck run), 4:14
- Utah – Caesar Rayford 16-yard interception return (Ben Scott kick), 2:33
- Arizona – J.J. McKelvey 9-yard pass from Nick Davila (Fabrizio Scaccia kick no good), 0:12
- Arizona – Marcus Pittman 0-yard fumble return (Fabrizio Scaccia kick), 0:00

3rd quarter

- Utah – Michael Affleck 1-yard run (Ben Scott kick no good), 13:07
- Arizona – Rod Windsor 10-yard pass from Nick Davila (Fabrizio Scaccia kick), 10:13
- Arizona – Rod Windsor 7-yard pass from Nick Davila (Fabrizio Scaccia kick), 5:11
- Utah – Caesar Rayford 30-yard interception return (Ben Scott kick), 0:41

4th quarter

- Arizona – John Booker 4-yard pass from Nick Davila (Fabrizio Scaccia kick), 11:29
- Arizona – Rod Windsor 25-yard pass from Nick Davila (Fabrizio Scaccia kick), 5:23
- Arizona – Rod Windsor 15-yard pass from Billy Farris (Fabrizio Scaccia kick), 1:00
- Utah – Aaron Boone 30-yard pass from Michael Affleck (Ben Scott kick no good), 0:54

Passing

- Arizona – Nick Davila: 28/37, 335 yards, 9 TD, 2 INT
- Utah – Michael Affleck: 14/25, 242 yards, 4 TD

Rushing

- Arizona – John Booker: 4 att, 10 yards, 1 TD
- Utah – Damian Walker: 1 att, 3 yards

Receiving

- Arizona – Rod Windsor: 15 rec, 152 yards, 6 TD
- Utah – Aaron Boone: 7 rec, 161 yards, 4 TD

=== Week 10: at Cleveland Gladiators ===
Quarter	1	2	3	4	Total
Blaze	6	7	14	12	39
Gladiators	6	20	28	21	75

at Quicken Loans Arena, Cleveland, Ohio

- Date: June 4
- Game time: 7:30 pm EDT
- Game attendance: 7,751
- Referee: Ron Torbert
- Recap

=== Week 11: vs. Chicago Rush ===
Quarter	1	2	3	4	Total
Rush	14	28	21	7	70
Blaze	14	6	10	20	50

at Maverik Center, West Valley City, Utah

- Date: June 12
- Game time: 9:05 pm EDT
- Game attendance: 4,892
- Referee: Steve Strimling
- Recap

Game information

1st quarter

- Utah – Mark Thorson 1-yard run (Ben Scott kick), 9:14
- Chicago – Travis LaTendresse 12-yard pass from Russ Michna (Chris Gould kick), 7:27
- Utah – Aaron Boone 12-yard pass from Mark Thorson (Ben Scott kick), 4:03
- Chicago – Travis LaTendresse 20-yard pass from Russ Michna (Chris Gould kick), 0:59

2nd quarter

- Chicago – Allen Turner 3-yard pass from Russ Michna (Chris Gould kick), 12:19
- Chicago – Samie Parker 17-yard pass from Russ Michna (Chris Gould kick), 9:56
- Utah – Damian Walker 5-yard run (Ben Scott kick no good), 4:42
- Chicago – Robert Boss 4-yard run (Chris Gould kick), 2:00
- Chicago – Josh Ferguson 38-yard interception return (Chris Gould kick), 0:08

3rd quarter

- Utah – Aaron LeSue 0-yard kickoff return (Ben Scott kick), 14:40
- Chicago – Travis LaTendresse 11-yard pass from Russ Michna (Chris Gould kick), 11:11
- Utah – Ben Scott 33-yard field goal, 7:54
- Chicago – Samie Parker 49-yard pass from Russ Michna (Chris Gould kick), 5:09
- Chicago – Mark Weivoda 2-yard fumble return (Chris Gould kick), 3:46

4th quarter

- Utah – Aaron LeSue 7-yard pass from Taylor Tharp (Ben Scott kick), 14:22
- Utah – Aaron Boone 7-yard pass from Taylor Tharp (Ben Scott kick), 8:26
- Chicago – J.J. Raterink 1-yard run (Chris Gould kick), 4:37
- Utah – Taylor Tharp 2-yard run (Ben Scott kick no good), 1:26

Passing

- Chicago – Russ Michna: 16/19, 217 yards, 6 TD
- Utah – Mark Thorson: 13/20, 142 yards, 1 TD, 1 INT

Rushing

- Chicago – Robert Boss: 6 att, 9 yards, 1 TD
- Utah – Damian Walker: 5 att, 21 yards, 1 TD

Receiving

- Chicago – Samie Parker: 9 rec, 117 yards, 2 TD
- Utah – Aaron Boone: 9 rec, 103 yards, 2 TD

=== Week 12: vs. Tampa Bay Storm ===
Quarter	1	2	3	4	Total
Storm	21	14	16	14	65
Blaze	6	21	13	0	40

at Maverik Center, West Valley City, Utah

- Date: June 19
- Game time: 9:30 pm EDT
- Game attendance: 4,525
- Referee: Steve Strimling
- Recap^{[usurped]}

Game information

1st quarter

- Tampa Bay – Hank Edwards 36-yard pass from Brett Dietz (Garrett Rivas kick), 13:46
- Tampa Bay – Tyrone Timmons 41-yard pass from Brett Dietz (Garrett Rivas kick), 10:11
- Utah – Damian Walker 4-yard run (Ben Scott kick no good), 6:24
- Tampa Bay – DeAndrew Rubin 32-yard pass from Brett Dietz (Garrett Rivas kick), 4:32

2nd quarter

- Utah – Aaron Boone 3-yard pass from Brett Elliott (Ben Scott kick), 13:20
- Tampa Bay – Hank Edwards 15-yard pass from Brett Dietz (Garrett Rivas kick), 11:37
- Utah – Aaron Boone 20-yard pass from Brett Elliott (Ben Scott kick), 10:33
- Utah – Chris Francies 18-yard pass from Brett Elliott (Ben Scott kick), 4:08
- Tampa Bay – Hank Edwards 16-yard pass from Brett Dietz (Garrett Rivas kick), 0:08

3rd quarter

- Tampa Bay – Hank Edwards 14-yard pass from Brett Dietz (Garrett Rivas kick), 9:48
- Utah – Chris Solomona 7-yard pass from Brett Elliott (Ben Scott kick blocked), 7:51
- Tampa Bay – Tyrone Timmons 23-yard pass from Brett Dietz (Garrett Rivas kick), 4:06
- Utah – Akamu Aki 14-yard pass from Brett Elliott (Ben Scott kick), 0:34

4th quarter

- Tampa Bay – Tyrone Timmons 19-yard pass from Brett Dietz (Garrett Rivas kick), 13:12
- Tampa Bay – Hank Edwards 4-yard pass from Brett Dietz (Garrett Rivas kick), 11:24

Passing

- Tampa Bay – Brett Dietz: 23/37, 323 yards, 9 TD, 1 INT
- Utah – Brett Elliott: 19/33, 179 yards, 5 TD, 3 INT

Rushing

- Tampa Bay – Terrence Royal: 3 att, 10 yards
- Utah – Damian Walker: 1 att, 4 yards, 1 TD

Receiving

- Tampa Bay – Hank Edwards: 14 rec, 195 yards, 5 TD
- Utah – Aaron Boone: 10 rec, 106 yards, 2 TD

=== Week 13: at Iowa Barnstormers ===
Quarter	1	2	3	4	Total
Blaze	13	13	6	0	32
Barnstormers	21	28	6	13	68

at Wells Fargo Arena, Des Moines, Iowa

- Date: June 26
- Game time: 8:05 pm EDT
- Game attendance: 9,582
- Referee: Brad Van Vark
- Recap

Game information

1st quarter

- Iowa – Jesse Schmidt 23-yard pass from Ryan Vena (Jeff Glas kick), 11:34
- Utah – Aaron Boone 7-yard pass from Brett Elliott (Ben Scott kick no good), 10:15
- Iowa – Todd Blythe 10-yard pass from Ryan Vena (Jeff Glas kick), 4:31
- Utah – Damian Walker 1-yard run (Ben Scott kick), 2:08
- Iowa – Larry Kendrick 16-yard pass from Ryan Vena (Jeff Glas kick), 0:00

2nd quarter

- Iowa – Rodney Filer 1-yard run (Jeff Glas kick), 9:18
- Iowa – Larry Kendrick 16-yard pass from Ryan Vena (Jeff Glas kick), 6:42
- Utah – Jermaine Carpenter 17-yard pass from Brett Elliott (Ben Scott kick), 1:26
- Iowa – Rodney Filer 7-yard run (Jeff Glas kick), 0:56
- Utah – Aaron Boone 3-yard pass from Brett Elliott (Ben Scott kick no good), 0:18
- Iowa – Jesse Schmidt 10-yard pass from Ryan Vena (Jeff Glas kick), 0:03

3rd quarter

- Utah – Aaron Boone 4-yard pass from Brett Elliott (Ben Scott kick no good), 7:21
- Iowa – Brian Villanueva 16-yard pass from Ryan Vena (Jeff Glas kick no good), 3:20

4th quarter

- Iowa – Jesse Schmidt 24-yard pass from Ryan Vena (Jeff Glas kick), 9:51
- Iowa – Ryan Vena 2-yard run (Jeff Glas kick no good), 2:41

Passing

- Utah – Brett Elliott: 24/49, 229 yards, 4 TD, 2 INT
- Iowa – Ryan Vena: 20/22, 245 yards, 7 TD

Rushing

- Utah – Jermaine Carpenter: 1 att, 9 yards
- Iowa – Ryan Vena: 3 att, 38 yards, 1 TD

Receiving

- Utah – Aaron Boone: 9 rec, 99 yards, 3 TD
- Iowa – Larry Kendrick: 7 rec, 93 yards, 2 TD

=== Week 14: vs. Milwaukee Iron ===
Quarter	1	2	3	4	Total
Iron	21	27	20	14	82
Blaze	14	21	7	14	56

at Maverik Center, West Valley City, Utah

- Date: July 3
- Game time: 7:00 pm EDT
- Game attendance: 3,537
- Referee: Steve Strimling
- Recap

Game information

1st quarter

- Milwaukee – Tyre Young 1-yard run (Robert Forstrom kick), 7:02
- Utah – Akamu Aki 5-yard pass from Brett Elliott (Ben Scott kick), 4:44
- Milwaukee – Damian Harrell 28-yard pass from Chris Greisen (Robert Forstrom kick), 2:34
- Utah – Wendall Williams 19-yard pass from Brett Elliott (Ben Scott kick), 1:06
- Milwaukee – Antoine Burns 54-yard kickoff return (Robert Forstrom kick), 0:13

2nd quarter

- Milwaukee – Damian Harrell 15-yard pass from Chris Greisen (Robert Forstrom kick), 13:48
- Utah – Aaron Boone 26-yard pass from Brett Elliott (Ben Scott kick), 11:30
- Milwaukee – Damian Harrell 14-yard pass from Chris Greisen (Robert Forstrom kick), 8:26
- Utah – Brett Elliott 1-yard run (Ben Scott kick), 3:18
- Milwaukee – Antoine Burns 5-yard pass from Chris Greisen (Robert Forstrom kick), 1:00
- Utah – Aaron Boone 11-yard pass from Brett Elliott (Ben Scott kick), 0:12
- Milwaukee – Antoine Burns 41-yard pass from Chris Greisen (Chris Greisen pass no good), 0:02

3rd quarter

- Milwaukee – Anthony Jones 11-yard pass from Chris Greisen (Robert Forstrom kick), 10:44
- Milwaukee – Tyre Young 2-yard run (Robert Forstrom kick), 8:40
- Utah – Aaron Boone 4-yard pass from Brett Elliott (Ben Scott kick), 4:27
- Milwaukee – Anthony Jones 46-yard pass from Chris Greisen (Robert Forstrom pass no good), 2:23

4th quarter

- Utah – Aaron LeSue 6-yard pass from Brett Elliott (Ben Scott kick), 14:25
- Milwaukee – Damian Harrell 8-yard pass from Chris Greisen (Robert Forstrom kick), 11:54
- Milwaukee – Anthony Jones 29-yard pass from Chris Crane (Robert Forstrom kick), 1:32
- Utah – Aaron Boone 16-yard pass from Brett Elliott (Ben Scott kick), 0:42

Passing

- Milwaukee – Chris Greisen: 21/23, 330 yards, 8 TD
- Utah – Brett Elliott: 26/38, 264 yards, 7 TD, 2 INT

Rushing

- Milwaukee – Tyre Young: 5 att, 12 yards, 2 TD
- Utah – Damian Walker: 6 att, 10 yards

Receiving

- Milwaukee – Anthony Jones: 7 rec, 144 yards, 3 TD
- Utah – Aaron Boone: 16 rec, 176 yards, 4 TD

=== Week 15: vs. Jacksonville Sharks ===
Quarter	1	2	3	4	Total
Sharks	13	27	20	7	67
Blaze	7	7	21	21	56

at E Center, West Valley City, Utah

- Date: July 10
- Game time: 9:05 pm EDT
- Game attendance: 4,508
- Referee: Steve Strimling
- Recap

Game information

1st quarter

- Jacksonville – Jomo Wilson 55-yard kickoff return (Paul Edinger kick no good), 14:06
- Utah – Wendall Williams 23-yard pass from Brett Elliott (Ben Scott kick), 10:08
- Jacksonville – Kirby Griffin 3-yard run (Paul Edinger kick), 3:30

2nd quarter

- Jacksonville – Kirby Griffin 28-yard pass from Aaron Garcia (Paul Edinger kick no good), 13:12
- Utah – Wendall Williams 30-yard pass from Brett Elliott (Ben Scott kick), 10:22
- Jacksonville – Sale' Key 33-yard pass from Aaron Garcia (Paul Edinger kick), 8:30
- Jacksonville – Jason Willis 23-yard pass from Aaron Garcia (Paul Edinger kick), 5:02
- Jacksonville – Dallas Baker 11-yard pass from Aaron Garcia (Paul Edinger kick), 0:24

3rd quarter

- Jacksonville – Jason Perry 40-yard interception return (Paul Edinger kick), 12:31
- Utah – Brandon Hampton 56-yard kickoff return (Ben Scott kick), 11:41
- Jacksonville – Kirby Griffin 2-yard run (Paul Edinger kick), 8:33
- Utah – Aaron Boone 15-yard pass from Brett Elliott (Ben Scott kick), 6:16
- Jacksonville – Isaac Morales 6-yard pass from Aaron Garcia (Paul Edinger kick no good), 4:30
- Utah – Aaron Boone 14-yard pass from Brett Elliott (Ben Scott kick), 0:44

4th quarter

- Jacksonville – Dallas Baker 36-yard pass from Bernard Morris (Paul Edinger kick), 14:24
- Utah – Wendall Williams 20-yard pass from Brett Elliott (Ben Scott kick), 13:13
- Utah – Wendall Williams 25-yard pass from Brett Elliott (Ben Scott kick), 8:51
- Utah – Aaron Boone 3-yard pass from Brett Elliott (Ben Scott kick), 0:38

Passing

- Jacksonville – Aaron Garcia: 18/21, 222 yards, 5 TD
- Utah – Brett Elliott: 26/50, 318 yards, 7 TD, 2 INT

Rushing

- Jacksonville – Kirby Griffin: 3 att, 6 yards, 2 TD
- Utah – Damian Walker: 2 att, −2 yards

Receiving

- Jacksonville – Dallas Baker: 9 rec, 123 yards, 2 TD
- Utah – Wendall Williams: 9 rec, 148 yards, 4 TD

=== Week 16: at Arizona Rattlers ===
Quarter	1	2	3	4	Total
Blaze	3	7	3	7	20
Rattlers	0	34	7	7	48

at US Airways Center, Phoenix, Arizona

- Date: July 16
- Game time: 10:30 pm EDT
- Game attendance: 10,317
- Referee: Shawn Hochuli
- Recap

Game information

1st quarter

- Utah – Ben Scott 18-yard field goal, 5:33

2nd quarter

- Arizona – J.J. McKelvey 7-yard pass from Nick Davila (Fabrizio Scaccia kick), 13:41
- Arizona – Rod Windsor 11-yard pass from Nick Davila (Fabrizio Scaccia kick), 11:08
- Utah – Chris Francies 17-yard pass from Brett Elliott (Ben Scott kick), 5:38
- Arizona – Rod Windsor 47-yard pass from Nick Davila (Fabrizio Scaccia kick), 4:36
- Arizona – Trandon Harvey 9-yard pass from Nick Davila (Fabrizio Scaccia kick), 0:14
- Arizona – Anttaj Hawthorne 0-yard fumble return (Fabrizio Scaccia kick no good), 0:00

3rd quarter

- Utah – Ben Scott 34-yard field goal
- Arizona – Trandon Harvey 12-yard pass from Nick Davila (Fabrizio Scaccia kick), 3:22

4th quarter

- Arizona – J.J. McKelvey 7-yard pass from Billy Farris (Fabrizio Scaccia kick), 7:27
- Utah – Aaron Boone 3-yard pass from Brett Elliott (Ben Scott kick), 2:04

Passing

- Utah – Brett Elliott: 16/34, 145 yards, 2 TD, 1 INT
- Arizona – Nick Davila: 14/19, 199 yards, 5 TD

Rushing

- Utah – Damian Walker: 4 att, 4 yards
- Arizona – Alex Guerrero: 3 att, 19 yards

Receiving

- Utah – Chris Francies: 4 rec, 64 yards, 1 TD
- Arizona – Rod Windsor: 8 rec, 136 yards, 2 TD

=== Week 17: at Dallas Vigilantes ===
Quarter	1	2	3	4	Total
Blaze	14	20	7	10	51
Vigilantes	13	14	14	0	41

at American Airlines Center, Dallas, Texas

- Date: July 23
- Game time: 7:30 pm EDT
- Game attendance: 9,123
- Referee: Mark Windham
- Recap

Game information

1st quarter

- Dallas – Derek Lee 20-yard pass from Collin Drafts (Mark Lewis kick no good), 12:21
- Utah – Aaron Boone 3-yard pass from Mark Thorson (Ben Scott kick), 7:02
- Dallas – Derek Lee 13-yard pass from Collin Drafts (Mark Lewis kick), 5:32
- Utah – Aaron Boone 14-yard pass from Mark Thorson (Ben Scott kick), 1:27

2nd quarter

- Dallas – Larry Brackins 7-yard pass from Collin Drafts (Mark Lewis kick), 14:19
- Utah – Aaron Boone 2-yard pass from Mark Thorson (Ben Scott kick no good), 8:43
- Dallas – Larry Brackins 4-yard pass from Collin Drafts (Mark Lewis kick), 3:35
- Utah – Wendall Williams 14-yard pass from Mark Thorson (Ben Scott kick), 2:29
- Utah – Aaron Boone 3-yard pass from Mark Thorson (Ben Scott kick), 0:14

3rd quarter

- Utah – Damian Walker 5-yard pass from Mark Thorson (Ben Scott kick), 8:48
- Dallas – Larry Brackins 21-yard pass from Daniel Raudabaugh (Mark Lewis kick), 5:56
- Dallas – Derek Lee 15-yard pass from Daniel Raudabaugh (Mark Lewis kick), 1:26

4th quarter

- Utah – Aaron Boone 5-yard pass from Brett Elliott (Ben Scott kick), 5:09
- Utah – Ben Scott 9-yard field goal, 0:31

Passing

- Utah – Mark Thorson: 22/38, 145 yards, 2 TD, 2 INT
- Dallas – Daniel Raudabaugh: 9/17, 131 yards, 2 TD

Rushing

- Utah – Damian Walker: 5 att, 3 yards
- Dallas – Tommy Taggart: 1 att, 5 yards

Receiving

- Utah – Wendall Williams: 10 rec, 137 yards, 1 TD
- Dallas – Larry Brackins: 9 rec, 98 yards, 3 TD

=== Week 18: at Alabama Vipers ===
Quarter	1	2	3	4	Total
Blaze	14	14	13	23	64
Vipers	21	21	14	12	68

at Von Braun Center, Huntsville, Alabama

- Date: July 31
- Game time: 8:30 pm EDT
- Game attendance: 5,136
- Recap

Game information

1st quarter

- Alabama – Willie Quinne 1-yard pass from Clint Stoerner (Brian Jackson kick), 9:28
- Utah – Damian Walker 8-yard pass from Mark Thorson (Ben Scott kick), 6:29
- Alabama – C.J. Johnson 56-yard kickoff return (Brian Jackson kick), 5:05
- Alabama – Vince Hill 3-yard fumble return (Brian Jackson kick), 3:39
- Utah – Aaron LeSue 45-yard pass from Mark Thorson (Ben Scott kick), 1:42

2nd quarter

- Alabama – C.J. Johnson 20-yard pass from Clint Stoerner (Brian Jackson kick), 13:34
- Alabama – Willie Quinne 6-yard pass from Clint Stoerner (Brian Jackson kick), 9:46
- Utah – Aaron LeSue 3-yard run (Ben Scott kick), 5:23
- Utah – Aaron Boone 3-yard pass from Brett Elliott (Ben Scott kick), 1:54
- Alabama – C.J. Johnson 10-yard pass from Clint Stoerner (Brian Jackson kick), 1:14

3rd quarter

- Alabama – Aaron Boone 5-yard pass from Brett Elliott (Ben Scott kick), 13:07
- Utah – C.J. Johnson 15-yard pass from Clint Stoerner (Brian Jackson kick), 10:23
- Alabama – Vince Hill 29-yard interception return (Brian Jackson kick), 8:16
- Alabama – Brett Elliott 1-yard run (Ben Scott kick no good), 3:39

4th quarter

- Utah – Aaron LeSue 4-yard pass from Brett Elliott (Ben Scott kick), 12:26
- Utah – Jason Boone 35-yard pass from Brett Elliott (Jason Boone pass no good), 7:23
- Utah – Aaron LeSue 12-yard pass from Brett Elliott (Ben Scott kick), 4:57
- Alabama – Willie Quinne 13-yard pass from Clint Stoerner (Clint Stoerner pass no good), 1:00
- Utah – Ben Scott 12-yard field goal, 0:39
- Alabama – Jeremy Grier 27-yard pass from Clint Stoerner (Clint Stoerner run no good), 0:27

Passing

- Utah – Brett Elliott: 21/30, 205 yards, 5 TD, 3 INT
- Alabama – Clint Stoerner: 21/30, 210 yards, 7 TD, 1 INT

Rushing

- Utah – Aaron LeSue: 2 att, 9 yards, 1 TD
- Alabama – Dan Alexander: 5 att, 12 yards

Receiving

- Utah – Aaron LeSue: 7 rec, 121 yards, 3 TD
- Alabama – C.J. Johnson: 11 rec, 114 yards, 3 TD
