= 2010 Iowa Barnstormers season =

Arena Football League team season

- Head coach: John Gregory
- Home stadium: Wells Fargo Arena

Results
- Record: 7–9
- Division place: 4th NC Midwest
- Playoffs: did not qualify

The 2010 Iowa Barnstormers season was the 10th season for the franchise, and the sixth in the Arena Football League, after three total seasons from 2001–2009 in the AF2, which dissolved following the 2009 season. The team was coached by John Gregory and played their home games at Wells Fargo Arena. The Barnstormers failed to make the playoffs when they finished the regular season 6th in the National Conference with a 7–9 record.

== Standings ==
Midwest Division
| Team | W | L | PCT | PF | PA | DIV | CON | Home | Away |
| y-Milwaukee Iron | 11 | 5 | .687 | 1043 | 903 | 5–1 | 8–3 | 7–1 | 4–4 |
| x-Chicago Rush | 10 | 6 | .625 | 906 | 873 | 4–2 | 8–3 | 5–3 | 5–3 |
| Cleveland Gladiators | 7 | 9 | .438 | 938 | 906 | 2–4 | 4–6 | 4–4 | 3–5 |
| Iowa Barnstormers | 7 | 9 | .438 | 829 | 833 | 1–5 | 3–7 | 2–6 | 5–3 |

y - Clinched division
x - Clinched playoff berth

== Regular season schedule ==
The Barnstormers began the season at home against the Rush on April 2. Their final regular season game was on the road against the Rattlers on July 31.

| Week | Day | Date | Kickoff | Opponent | Results | | Location | Report |
| Week | Day | Date | Kickoff | Opponent | Score | Record | Location | Report |
|---|---|---|---|---|---|---|---|---|
| 1 | Friday | April 2 | 7:05 PM | Chicago Rush | L 43–61 | 0–1 | Wells Fargo Arena | ^{[usurped]} |
| 2 | Bye | | | | | | | |
| 3 | Friday | April 16 | 7:30 PM | at Milwaukee Iron | L 48–65 | 0–2 | Bradley Center | ^{[usurped]} |
| 4 | Saturday | April 24 | 7:05 PM | Oklahoma City Yard Dawgz | W 68–60 | 1–2 | Wells Fargo Arena | |
| 5 | Friday | April 30 | 7:00 PM | at Orlando Predators | W 50–40 | 2–2 | Amway Arena | |
| 6 | Saturday | May 8 | 8:05 PM | Cleveland Gladiators | L 56–70 | 2–3 | Wells Fargo Arena | |
| 7 | Saturday | May 15 | 7:00 PM | at Chicago Rush | W 44–30 | 3–3 | Allstate Arena | |
| 8 | Friday | May 21 | 7:05 PM | Arizona Rattlers | L 48–52 | 3–4 | Wells Fargo Arena | |
| 9 | Bye | | | | | | | |
| 10 | Saturday | June 5 | 7:05 PM | Alabama Vipers | L 44–45 | 3–5 | Wells Fargo Arena | |
| 11 | Saturday | June 12 | 7:05 PM | at Bossier–Shreveport Battle Wings | W 48–42 | 4–5 | CenturyTel Center | |
| 12 | Saturday | June 19 | 7:00 PM | at Cleveland Gladiators | L 35–76 | 4–6 | Quicken Loans Arena | |
| 13 | Saturday | June 26 | 7:05 PM | Utah Blaze | W 68–32 | 5–6 | Wells Fargo Arena | |
| 14 | Friday | July 2 | 7:30 PM | at Dallas Vigilantes | W 59–38 | 6–6 | American Airlines Center | |
| 15 | Saturday | July 10 | 7:05 PM | at Oklahoma City Yard Dawgz | L 42–52 | 6–7 | Cox Convention Center | ^{[usurped]} |
| 16 | Friday | July 16 | 7:05 PM | Spokane Shock | L 42–48 | 6–8 | Wells Fargo Arena | |
| 17 | Saturday | July 24 | 7:05 PM | Milwaukee Iron | L 67–75 | 6–9 | Wells Fargo Arena | |
| 18 | Saturday | July 31 | 9:30 PM | at Arizona Rattlers | W 67–47 | 7–9 | US Airways Center | |

All times are CDT

== Roster ==
2010 Iowa Barnstormers roster
| Quarterbacks: 7 Ryan Vena; 4 Brian Villanueva; Fullbacks: 34 Rodney Filer; 41 J. J. Payne; Wide receivers: 15 Larry Kendrick; 5 Errick McCown; 22 Jesse Schmidt | Offensive linemen: 62 Eric Anderson; 70 Mike Dansby; 90 Michael Jones; 66 Eric Rothwell; 55 Pete Traynor; Defensive linemen: 77 Willie Johnson; 50 Michael Lewis; 33 Alfred Peterson | Linebackers: 30 Derrick Byrd; 9 Micha King; Defensive backs: 2 Khalil Carter; 6 Jason Simpson; -- Ahmaad Smith; 20 Tanner Varner; Kickers: 3 Jeff Glas | Injured reserve: 11 Todd Blythe WR (IR); 44 Brent Curvey DL (IR); 10 Tommy Ellingworth WR (IR); Other league exempt: -- Tyson Smith DL (Exempt); Refused to report: -- Steve Cully (DNR); -- Bryan Lee-Laudusky QB (DNR); Suspension: 21 Stanley Smith LB (Susp.); Rookies in italics; Roster updated July 20, 2010; 22 Active, 7 Inactive |

== Regular season ==
=== Week 1: vs. Chicago Rush ===
| Quarter | 1 | 2 | 3 | 4 | Total |
|---|---|---|---|---|---|
| Rush | 17 | 17 | 7 | 20 | 61 |
| Barnstormers | 0 | 22 | 0 | 21 | 43 |

at Wells Fargo Arena, Des Moines, Iowa

- Date: April 2
- Game time: 8:05 pm EDT
- Game attendance: 12,184
- Referee: Brad Van Vark
- Recap^{[usurped]}

Game information

1st quarter

- Chicago – DeJuan Alfonzo 9-yard interception return (Chris Gould kick), 9:45
- Chicago – Palauni Ma Sun 5-yard pass from Russ Michna (Chris Gould kick), 4:36
- Chicago – Chris Gould 27-yard field goal, 1:00

2nd quarter

- Iowa – Jesse Schmidt 24-yard pass from Ryan Vena (Jeff Glas kick no good), 13:14
- Iowa – Ryan Vena 1-yard run (Jeff Glas kick no good), 11:07
- Chicago – Kenny Higgins 13-yard pass from Russ Michna (Chris Gould kick), 7:38
- Iowa – Jeff Glas 21-yard field goal, 4:12
- Chicago – Samie Parker 42-yard pass from Russ Michna (Chris Gould kick), 2:58
- Iowa – Todd Blythe 17-yard pass from Ryan Vena (Jeff Glas kick), 0:08
- Chicago – Chris Gould 34-yard field goal (Chris Gould kick), 0:00

3rd quarter

- Chicago – Allen Turner 14-yard pass from Russ Michna (Chris Gould kick), 9:39

4th quarter

- Chicago – Samie Parker 30-yard pass from Russ Michna (Chris Gould kick no good), 12:29
- Iowa – Todd Blythe 5-yard pass from Ryan Vena (Jeff Glas kick), 9:37
- Iowa – Ryan Vena 2-yard run (Todd Blythe pass), 6:00
- Chicago – Kenny Higgins 10-yard pass from Russ Michna (Chris Gould kick), 1:45
- Iowa – Timothy Dodge 6-yard pass from Ryan Vena no good), 0:33
- Chicago – Robert Boss 6-yard run (Chris Gould kick), 0:26

Passing

- Chicago – Russ Michna: 18/28, 261 yards, 6 TD, 1 INT
- Iowa – Ryan Vena: 18/40, 245 yards, 4 TD, 3 INT

Rushing

- Chicago – Robert Boss: 9 att, 6 yards, 1 TD
- Iowa – Ryan Vena: 4 att, 6 yards, 2 TD

Receiving

- Chicago – Samie Parker: 6 rec, 104 yards, 2 TD
- Iowa – Jesse Schmidt: 8 rec, 129 yards, 1 TD

Chicago's DeJuan Alfonzo returned an interception from Brian Villanueva for a touchdown on Iowa's first play from scrimmage, sparking the visiting Rush to a 17–0 first-quarter lead. The Barnstormers turned the ball over six times in their first Arena Football League contest since 2000. After Iowa inserted Ryan Vena at quarterback for the second quarter trailing 17–0, he tossed touchdown passes to Jesse Schmidt and Todd Blythe to close the gap to 34–22 by halftime; however, Chicago would shut Iowa out in the third quarter and score early in the fourth to push the advantage to 47–22. A Vena pass to Blythe and a Vena run pulled Iowa to within 47–37 with six minutes remaining, but Chicago's Russ Michna hit Kenny Higgins to put the game out of reach, sending a record crowd of 12,184 fans home unhappy.

=== Week 3: at Milwaukee Iron ===
| Quarter | 1 | 2 | 3 | 4 | Total |
|---|---|---|---|---|---|
| Barnstormers | 6 | 13 | 15 | 14 | 48 |
| Iron | 16 | 14 | 14 | 21 | 65 |

at Bradley Center, Milwaukee, Wisconsin

- Date: April 16
- Game time: 8:30 pm EDT
- Game attendance: 5,032
- Referee: Bob McElwee
- Recap^{[usurped]}

Game information

1st quarter

- Milwaukee – Greisen 16-yard pass from Forse (Forstrom kick no good), 12:42
- Milwaukee – Greisen 4-yard pass from Jones (Forstrom kick), 8:58
- Iowa – Vena 20-yard pass from Blythe (Glas kick no good), 6:02
- Milwaukee – Forstrom 19-yard field goal, 1:30

2nd quarter

- Iowa – Vena 12-yard pass from Schmidt (2-point conversion no good), 14:52
- Milwaukee – Greisen 20-yard pass from Forse (Forstrom kick), 11:56
- Iowa – Vena 7-yard pass from Dodge (Glas kick), 7:28
- Milwaukee – Greisen 22-yard pass from Forse (Forstrom kick), 4:10

3rd quarter

- Milwaukee – Greisen 22-yard pass from Forse (Forstrom kick), 10:28
- Iowa – Vena 6-yard pass from Blythe (Glas kick), 7:26
- Milwaukee – Greisen 43-yard pass from Jones (Forstrom kick), 5:57
- Iowa – Vena 1-yard run (Vena pass to Dodge), 0:31

4th quarter

- Milwaukee – Greisen 33-yard pass from Jones (Forstrom kick), 14:26
- Iowa – McCown 15-yard pass from Vena (Glas kick), 12:26
- Milwaukee – Greisen 4-yard pass from Jones (Forstrom kick), 7:47
- Iowa – Vena 31-yard pass from Blythe (Glas kick), 5:19
- Milwaukee – Young 5-yard run (Forstrom kick), 4:33

Passing

- Iowa – Ryan Vena: 24/37, 252 yards, 6 TD, 2 INT
- Milwaukee – Chris Greisen: 25/36, 382 yards, 7 TD

Rushing

- Iowa – Ryan Vena 7 att, 12 yards, 1 TD
- Milwaukee – Tyre Young: 4 att, 13 yards, 1 TD

Receiving

- Iowa – Todd Blythe: 9 rec, 118 yards, 3 TD
- Milwaukee – Tiger Jones: 12 rec, 171 yards, 3 TD

Two Midwestern foes found themselves head to head this weekend. The Iowa Barnstormers traveled to Milwaukee, Wisconsin to take on the Iron in their first of two meetings this season. Milwaukee won their home opener in front of the crowd of 5,032 Iron faithful. QB Chris Greisen continued his dominance at the quarterback position, throwing 25-of-36 for 382 yards and seven touchdowns. Greisen has yet to throw an interception this season. While Greisen continues to shine, it is his offensive counterparts that are successful in bringing the ball into the end zone. WRs Nate Forse and Anthony “Tiger” Jones have proven to be Greisen’s perfect receiving duo. Jones brought in three touchdowns on 12 catches for 171 yards this weekend, while Forse made 10 catches for 146 yards and three scores. Greisen’s seventh touchdown was caught by Alvance Robinson. Not to be outdone, Milwaukee’s defense also helped to hold off and Barnstormers serge. Marcus Everett intercepted QB Ryan Vena’s first possession of the game, eventually leading to an Iron score. Milwaukee managed to pull ahead 13–0 before the Barnstormers got into the game. WR Todd Blythe, known for his athletic catches, caught a pass deep in the corner of the end zone to bring the score to 6–13, but Milwaukee would never once trail throughout the game.

Iowa’s QB Vena was intercepted twice, including a game-highlighting play. Milwaukee’s Virgil Gray nabbed an erratic Vena pass in the end zone, not only disrupting a score for the Barnstormers, but also proceeded to run the ball back 58 yards for a score of his own. Despite two players leaving with injuries in the second half, Milwaukee was able to hold off the Barnstormers and come away with the 17-point win.

=== Week 4: vs. Oklahoma City Yard Dawgz ===
| Quarter | 1 | 2 | 3 | 4 | Total |
|---|---|---|---|---|---|
| Yard Dawgz | 9 | 22 | 13 | 16 | 60 |
| Barnstormers | 13 | 14 | 13 | 28 | 68 |

at Wells Fargo Arena, Des Moines, Iowa

- Date: April 24
- Game time: 8:05 pm EDT
- Game attendance: 8,312
- Referee: Ron Torbert
- Recap

Game information

1st quarter

- Oklahoma City – Anthony Hines 15-yard pass from Tommy Grady (A.J. Haglund kick), 9:58
- Iowa – Todd Blythe 5-yard pass from Ryan Vena (Jeff Glas kick no good), 3:40
- Oklahoma City – Fred Shaw 16-yard blocked PAT return, 3:40
- Iowa – Larry Kendrick 1-yard fumble recovery (Jeff Glas kick), 2:53

2nd quarter

- Oklahoma City – Freddie Rollins 1-yard run (David Hyland pass no good), 12:15
- Iowa – Jesse Schmidt 24-yard pass from Ryan Vena (Jeff Glas kick), 10:45
- Oklahoma City – Al Hunt 11-yard pass from Tommy Grady (A.J. Haglund kick), 7:48
- Iowa – Ryan Vena 2-yard run (Jeff Glas kick), 3:02
- Oklahoma City – Anthony Hines 22-yard pass from Tommy Grady (A.J. Haglund kick), 0:38

3rd quarter

- Iowa – Jesse Schmidt 33-yard pass from Ryan Vena (Jeff Glas kick), 12:45
- Oklahoma City – Al Hunt 4-yard pass from Tommy Grady (A.J. Haglund kick), 9:25
- Oklahoma City – Mervin Brookins 44-yard fumble return (David Hyland pass no good), 6:43
- Iowa – Micah King 3-yard fumble return (Jeff Glas kick no good), 1:29

4th quarter

- Iowa – Jesse Schmidt 31-yard pass from Ryan Vena (Jeff Glas kick), 11:35
- Iowa – Ryan Vena 2-yard run (Jeff Glas kick), 6:02
- Oklahoma City – A.J. Haglund 17-yard field goal, 2:11
- Iowa – Ryan Vena 4-yard run (Jeff Glas kick), 6:02
- Oklahoma City – Freddie Rollins 3-yard pass from Tommy Grady (A.J. Haglund kick), 0:23
- Iowa – 11-yard onside kickoff return (Jeff Glas kick), 0:22
- Oklahoma City – Xavier Lee 5-yard pass from Tommy Grady (Tommy Grady pass no good), 0:00
- Oklahoma City – Tommy Grady: 31/44, 383 yards, 6 TD, 1 INT
- Iowa – Ryan Vena: 17/30, 217 yards, 4 TD

Rushing

- Oklahoma City – Freddie Rollins: 5 att, 16 yards, 1 TD
- Iowa – Ryan Vena: 5 att, 33 yards, 3 TD

Receiving

- Oklahoma City – Xavier Lee: 9 rec, 117 yards, 1 TD
- Iowa – Jesse Schmidt: 7 rec, 141 yards, 3 TD

Iowa gave up a touchdown on the game's opening drive on a 15-yard touchdown pass. The Barnstormers also scored a touchdown on their first possession, but the extra point was blocked and eventually taken into the end zone by the Yard Dawgz for 2 points. The ensuing kickoff return was fumbled and Iowa recovered the ball and took it in for a touchdown. Down at the half by 4 points, Iowa briefly held the lead in the 3rd quarter, but by the end of the quarter, they were still down by 4 points. Ryan Vena had a 31-yard passing touchdown, and also took one in himself, giving the Barnstormers a 54–44 lead in the 4th quarter. Oklahoma City scored a touchdown with 23 seconds left in the game, and attempted an onside kick down 7 points. Iowa took the onside kick and returned it for a touchdown, effectively sealing the win for their first victory of the season. Vena finished the game with 217 passing yards and 7 total touchdowns. Jesse Schmidt was the top receiver with 141 yards and 3 touchdowns.

=== Week 5: at Orlando Predators ===
| Quarter | 1 | 2 | 3 | 4 | Total |
|---|---|---|---|---|---|
| Barnstormers | 7 | 20 | 7 | 16 | 50 |
| Predators | 7 | 13 | 6 | 14 | 40 |

at Amway Arena, Orlando, Florida

- Date: April 30
- Game time: 8:00 pm EDT
- Game attendance: 11,076
- Referee: Greg LeFils
- Recap^{[usurped]}

Game information

1st quarter

- Iowa – Tanner Varner 7-yard interception return (Jeff Glas kick), 4:15
- Orlando – Derrick Lewis 14-yard pass from Nick Hill (Carlos Martinez kick), 2:15

2nd quarter

- Iowa – Todd Blythe 12-yard pass from Ryan Vena (Jeff Glas kick), 13:38
- Orlando – T.T. Toliver 5-yard pass from Nick Hill (Glenn Gauntt pass no good), 8:17
- Orlando – Rayshawn Kizer 3-yard fumble return (Carlos Martinez kick), 7:46
- Iowa – Ryan Vena 1-yard run (Jeff Glas kick), 2:25
- Iowa – Jesse Schmidt 20-yard pass from Ryan Vena (Charles Johnson pass no good), 0:28

3rd quarter

- Iowa – Todd Blythe 11-yard pass from Ryan Vena (Jeff Glas kick), 11:10
- Orlando – Jerrian James 5-yard pass from Nick Hill (Glenn Gauntt run no good), 5:27

4th quarter

- Iowa – Ryan Vena 3-yard run (Jeff Glas kick no good), 12:06
- Orlando – Nick Hill 3-yard run (Carlos Martinez kick), 9:33
- Iowa – Jesse Schmidt 40-yard pass from Ryan Vena (Jeff Glas kick), 1:17
- Orlando – Derrick Lewis 7-yard pass from Nick Hill (Carlos Martinez kick), 0:39
- Iowa – Jeff Glas 17-yard field goal, 0:13

Passing

- Iowa – Ryan Vena: 21/32, 236 yards, 4 TD, 3 INT
- Orlando – Nick Hill: 29/35, 237 yards, 4 TD, 3 INT

Rushing

- Iowa – Ryan Vena: 7 att, 15 yards, 2 TD
- Orlando – Nick Hill: 5 att, 18 yards, 1 TD

Receiving

- Iowa – Jesse Schmidt: 7 rec, 116 yards, 2 TD
- Orlando – Derrick Lewis: 12 rec, 112 yards, 2 TD

The Barnstormers won their second straight game with a win in Orlando. In the 4th quarter, up by 7 points and inside the Predators' 10-yard line, Ryan Vena was intercepted by Marlon Moye-Moore. The Predators drove all the way to Iowa's 9-yard line, but the Barnstormer defense was able to come up with a stop as the Predators threw four straight incomplete passes. Following the turnover on downs, Vena connected with Jesse Schmidt on a 40-yard pass for a touchdown. With 1:17 remaining, the Predators were unable to make a comeback, giving Iowa the win. Vena finished the game with 236 passing yards and 4 passing touchdowns, though he threw a season-high 3 interceptions. Jesse Schmidt was once again the leading receiver, with 116 yards and 2 touchdowns.

=== Week 6: vs. Cleveland Gladiators ===
| Quarter | 1 | 2 | 3 | 4 | Total |
|---|---|---|---|---|---|
| Gladiators | 14 | 21 | 14 | 21 | 70 |
| Barnstormers | 12 | 24 | 7 | 13 | 56 |

at Wells Fargo Arena, Des Moines, Iowa

- Date: May 8
- Game time: 8:05 pm EDT
- Game attendance: 8,059
- Referee: Brad Van Vark
- Recap

Game information

1st quarter

- Iowa – Rodney Filer 16-yard run (Jeff Glas kick no good), 11:42
- Cleveland – Adam Tadisch 1-yard run (Matt Denny kick), 8:58
- Cleveland – Davion Mitchell 5-yard fumble return (Matt Denny kick), 6:03
- Iowa – Todd Blythe 25-yard pass from Ryan Vena (Jeff Glas kick no good), 3:28

2nd quarter

- Iowa – Ryan Vena 1-yard run (Jeff Glas kick), 12:39
- Cleveland – Davion Mitchell 55-yard kickoff return (Matt Denny kick), 12:08
- Iowa – Jesse Schmidt 36-yard pass from Ryan Vena (Jeff Glas kick), 10:24
- Iowa – Jason Simpson 5-yard kickoff return (Jeff Glas kick), 9:28
- Cleveland – Ben Nelson 14-yard pass from John Dutton (Matt Denny kick), 6:00
- Iowa – Jeff Glas 17-yard field goal, 0:52
- Cleveland – Chris Johnson 1-yard run (Matt Denny kick), 0:13

3rd quarter

- Cleveland – Victor Williams 3-yard run (Matt Denny kick), 12:36
- Iowa – Ryan Vena 2-yard run (Jeff Glas kick), 6:43
- Cleveland – Victor Williams 4-yard pass from John Dutton (Matt Denny kick), 0:29

4th quarter

- Cleveland – Ben Nelson 5-yard pass from John Dutton (Matt Denny kick), 10:14
- Iowa – Ryan Vena 2-yard run (Jeff Glas kick no good), 8:10
- Cleveland – Ben Nelson 14-yard pass from John Dutton (Matt Denny kick), 5:50
- Iowa – Ryan Vena 2-yard run (Jeff Glas kick), 4:03
- Cleveland – Chris Johnson 32-yard pass from John Dutton (Matt Denny kick), 1:02

Passing

- Cleveland – John Dutton: 31/39, 355 yards, 5 TD
- Iowa – Ryan Vena: 16/30, 275 yards, 2 TD, 1 INT

Rushing

- Cleveland – Victor Williams: 1 att, 3 yards, 1 TD
- Iowa – Ryan Vena: 10 att, 30 yard, 4 TD

Receiving

- Cleveland – Chris Johnson: 13 rec, 166 yards, 1 TD
- Iowa – Todd Blythe: 6 rec, 131 yards, 1 TD

The Barnstormers jumped out to a lead of 12 points in the 2nd quarter, but the Gladiators cut it down to 36–35 at the half. Iowa's offense was unable to keep up with Cleveland's in the 2nd half, and after giving up the lead by allowing a 4-yard touchdown pass shortly before the end of the 3rd quarter, the Barnstormers never led the rest of the game, eventually losing by a score of 70–56. Ryan Vena barely completed half of his passes, with only a pair touchdown passes in the game. On the ground however, Vena compiled 30 yards and 4 touchdowns. Todd Blythe was the leading receiver with 6 catches for 131 yards and a touchdown.

=== Week 7: at Chicago Rush ===
| Quarter | 1 | 2 | 3 | 4 | Total |
|---|---|---|---|---|---|
| Barnstormers | 7 | 17 | 14 | 6 | 44 |
| Rush | 0 | 16 | 7 | 7 | 30 |

at Allstate Arena, Rosemont, Illinois

- Date: May 15
- Game time: 8:00 pm EDT
- Game attendance: 10,363
- Referee: Tom McCabe
- Recap

=== Week 8: vs. Arizona Rattlers ===
| Quarter | 1 | 2 | 3 | 4 | Total |
|---|---|---|---|---|---|
| Rattlers | 13 | 18 | 7 | 14 | 52 |
| Barnstormers | 7 | 13 | 14 | 14 | 48 |

at Wells Fargo Arena, Des Moines, Iowa

- Date: May 21
- Game time: 8:05 pm EDT
- Game attendance: 9,912
- Referee: Brad Van Vark
- Recap

Game information

1st quarter

- Arizona – J.J. McKelvey 12-yard pass from Nick Davila (Jason Witczak kick), 10:53
- Iowa – Timothy Dodge 5-yard pass from Ryan Vena (Jeff Glas kick), 7:21
- Arizona – Nick Davila 1-yard run (Jason Witczak kick no good), 3:07

2nd quarter

- Arizona – Rod Windsor 4-yard pass from Nick Davila (Johnie Kirton run), 11:47
- Iowa – Jesse Schmidt 17-yard pass from Ryan Vena (Jeff Glas kick), 6:50
- Arizona – Jason Witczak 14-yard field goal, 0:53
- Iowa – Jesse Schmidt 17-yard pass from Ryan Vena (Jeff Glas kick blocked), 0:30
- Arizona – Rod Windsor 4-yard run (Jason Witczak kick), 0:07

3rd quarter

- Iowa – Todd Blythe 24-yard pass from Ryan Vena (Jeff Glas kick), 11:35
- Arizona – Anthony Mix 7-yard pass from Nick Davila (Jason Witczak kick), 8:16
- Iowa – Anthony Mix 7-yard pass from Nick Davila (Jason Witczak kick), 1:48

4th quarter

- Iowa – Ryan Vena 1-yard run (Jeff Glas kick), 10:45
- Arizona – Terrance Sanders 56-yard kickoff return (Jason Witczak kick), 10:11
- Iowa – Tommy Ellingworth 20-yard pass from Ryan Vena (Jeff Glas kick), 7:46
- Arizona – J.J. McKelvey 6-yard pass from Nick Davila (Jason Witczak kick), 4:00

Passing

- Arizona – Nick Davila: 23/34, 222 yards, 4 TD
- Iowa – Ryan Vena: 20/32, 208 yards, 6 TD, 1 INT

Rushing

- Arizona – Johnie Kirton: 7 att, 27 yards
- Iowa – Ryan Vena: 5 att, 19 yard, 1 TD

Receiving

- Arizona – J.J. McKelvey: 12 rec, 131 yards, 2 TD
- Iowa – Jesse Schmidt: 8 rec, 92 yards, 2 TD

=== Week 10: vs. Alabama Vipers ===
| Quarter | 1 | 2 | 3 | 4 | Total |
|---|---|---|---|---|---|
| Vipers | 14 | 12 | 0 | 19 | 45 |
| Barnstormers | 7 | 21 | 13 | 3 | 44 |

at Wells Fargo Arena, Des Moines, Iowa

- Date: June 5
- Game time: 8:05 pm EDT
- Game attendance: 8,143
- Referee: Brad Van Vark
- Recap

Game information

1st quarter

- Alabama – Jeremy Grier 19-yard pass from Kevin Eakin (Greg Gundersen kick), 9:13
- Iowa – Tommy Ellingworth 12-yard pass from Ryan Vena (Jeff Glas kick), 4:54
- Alabama – Dan Alexander 1-yard run (Greg Gundersen kick), 0:11

2nd quarter

- Iowa – Jesse Schmidt 33-yard pass from Ryan Vena (Jeff Glas kick), 13:59
- Alabama – Jeremy Grier 17-yard pass from Kevin Eakin (Greg Gundersen kick no good), 12:03
- Iowa – Ryan Vena 6-yard run (Jeff Glas kick), 5:56
- Iowa – Tommy Ellingworth 35-yard pass from Ryan Vena (Jeff Glas kick), 0:49
- Alabama – Larry Shipp 5-yard pass from Kevin Eakin (Greg Gundersen kick no good), 0:14

3rd quarter

- Iowa – Todd Blythe 18-yard pass from Ryan Vena (Jeff Glas kick no good), 11:23
- Iowa – Tommy Ellingworth 15-yard pass from Ryan Vena (Jeff Glas kick), 5:09

4th quarter

- Alabama – Larry Shipp 4-yard pass from Kevin Eakin (Kevin Eakin pass no good), 14:29
- Alabama – Larry Shipp 10-yard pass from Kevin Eakin (Greg Gundersen kick), 5:11
- Iowa – Jeff Glas 18-yard field goal, 1:35
- Alabama – Alonzo Nix 14-yard pass from Kevin Eakin (Kevin Eakin pass no good), 0:05

Passing

- Alabama – Kevin Eakin: 34/50, 386 yards, 6 TD, 2 INT
- Iowa – Ryan Vena: 15/33, 222 yards, 5 TD, 2 INT

Rushing

- Alabama – Kevin Eakin: 2 att, 13 yards
- Iowa – Rodney Filer: 2 att, 15 yards

Receiving

- Alabama – Jeremy Grier: 12 rec, 138 yards, 2 TD
- Iowa – Tommy Ellingworth: 5 rec, 88 yards, 3 TD

=== Week 11: at Bossier–Shreveport Battle Wings ===
| Quarter | 1 | 2 | 3 | 4 | Total |
|---|---|---|---|---|---|
| Barnstormers | 7 | 14 | 21 | 6 | 48 |
| Battle Wings | 7 | 21 | 7 | 7 | 42 |

at CenturyTel Center, Bossier City, Louisiana

- Date: June 12
- Game time: 8:05 pm EDT
- Game attendance: 3,477
- Referee: Scott Vaughn
- Recap

Game information

1st quarter

- Bossier–Shreveport – Randy Hymes 40-yard pass from Gary Cooper (Nick Gatto kick), 13:41
- Iowa – Todd Blythe 32-yard pass from Ryan Vena (Jeff Glas kick), 5:21

2nd quarter

- Bossier–Shreveport – P.J. Berry 3-yard run (Nick Gatto kick), 10:00
- Iowa – Ryan Vena 1-yard run (Jeff Glas kick), 8:02
- Iowa – Todd Blythe 5-yard pass from Ryan Vena (Jeff Glas kick), 1:00
- Bossier–Shreveport – James Jordan 25-yard pass from Gary Cooper (Nick Gatto kick blocked), 0:05
- Bossier–Shreveport – P.J. Berry 58-yard field goal return (P.J. Berry pass)

3rd quarter

- Iowa – Todd Blythe 21-yard pass from Ryan Vena (Jeff Glas kick), 12:40
- Bossier–Shreveport – Willis Marshall 14-yard pass from Gary Cooper (Nick Gatto kick), 6:51
- Iowa – Ryan Vena 5-yard run (Jeff Glas kick), 4:17
- Iowa – Tommy Ellingworth 27-yard pass from Ryan Vena (Jeff Glas kick), 2:50

4th quarter

- Bossier–Shreveport – James Jordan 8-yard pass from Gary Cooper (Nick Gatto kick), 10:49
- Iowa – Todd Blythe 20-yard pass from Ryan Vena (Jeff Glas kick no good), 0:24

Passing

- Iowa – Ryan Vena: 20/30, 250 yards, 5 TD, 2 INT
- Bossier–Shreveport – Gary Cooper: 32/49, 237 yards, 4 TD, 3 INT

Rushing

- Iowa – Ryan Vena: 5 att, 13 yards, 2 TD
- Bossier–Shreveport – P.J. Berry: 2 att, 4 yards, 1 TD

Receiving

- Iowa – Todd Blythe: 9 rec, 127 yards, 4 TD
- Bossier–Shreveport – P.J. Berry: 12 rec, 111 yards

=== Week 12: at Cleveland Gladiators ===
| Quarter | 1 | 2 | 3 | 4 | Total |
|---|---|---|---|---|---|
| Barnstormers | 7 | 14 | 7 | 7 | 35 |
| Gladiators | 14 | 21 | 14 | 27 | 76 |

at Quicken Loans Arena, Cleveland, Ohio

- Date: June 19
- Game time: 7:00 pm EDT
- Game attendance: 8,179
- Referee: Ron Torbert
- Recap

Game information

1st quarter

- Cleveland – Russell Monk 1-yard run (Matt Denny kick), 11:48
- Iowa – Rodney Filer 3-yard run (Jeff Glas kick), 8:38
- Cleveland – Chris Johnson 13-yard pass from John Dutton (Matt Denny kick), 5:46

2nd quarter

- Cleveland – Ben Nelson 3-yard pass from John Dutton (Matt Denny kick), 13:42
- Iowa – Tommy Ellingworth 29-yard pass from Ryan Vena (Jeff Glas kick), 12:29
- Cleveland – Brent Holmes 13-yard pass from John Dutton (Matt Denny kick), 7:57
- Iowa – Tommy Ellingworth 6-yard pass from Ryan Vena (Jeff Glas kick), 3:11
- Cleveland – Ben Nelson 9-yard pass from John Dutton (Matt Denny kick), 0:09

3rd quarter

- Cleveland – Ben Nelson 30-yard pass from John Dutton (Matt Denny kick), 7:44
- Cleveland – Levy Brown 13-yard interception return (Matt Denny kick), 6:10
- Iowa – Todd Blythe 19-yard pass from Ryan Vena (Jeff Glas kick), 0:00

4th quarter

- Cleveland – Ben Nelson 38-yard pass from John Dutton (Matt Denny kick blocked)
- Iowa – Todd Blythe 5-yard pass from Ryan Vena (Jeff Glas kick), 12:12
- Cleveland – Carlos Campbell 47-yard fumble return (Matt Denny kick), 6:00
- Cleveland – Brent Holmes 29-yard pass from John Dutton (Matt Denny kick), 4:06
- Cleveland – Ben Nelson 6-yard pass from Kevin McCabe (Matt Denny kick), 1:00

Passing

- Iowa – Ryan Vena: 18/24, 207 yards, 4 TD, 1 INT
- Cleveland – John Dutton: 24/40, 284 yards, 7 TD

Rushing

- Iowa – Tommy Ellingworth: 1 att, 40 yards
- Cleveland – Ben Nelson: 1 att, 5 yards

Receiving

- Iowa – Todd Blythe: 8 rec, 100 yards, 2 TD
- Cleveland – Ben Nelson: 11 rec, 157 yards, 5 TD

=== Week 13: vs. Utah Blaze ===
| Quarter | 1 | 2 | 3 | 4 | Total |
|---|---|---|---|---|---|
| Blaze | 13 | 13 | 6 | 0 | 32 |
| Barnstormers | 21 | 28 | 6 | 13 | 68 |

at Wells Fargo Arena, Des Moines, Iowa

- Date: June 26
- Game time: 8:05 pm EDT
- Game attendance: 9,582
- Referee: Brad Van Vark
- Recap

Game information

1st quarter

- Iowa – Jesse Schmidt 23-yard pass from Ryan Vena (Jeff Glas kick), 11:34
- Utah – Aaron Boone 7-yard pass from Brett Elliott (Ben Scott kick no good), 10:15
- Iowa – Todd Blythe 10-yard pass from Ryan Vena (Jeff Glas kick), 4:31
- Utah – Damian Walker 1-yard run (Ben Scott kick), 2:08
- Iowa – Larry Kendrick 16-yard pass from Ryan Vena (Jeff Glas kick), 0:00

2nd quarter

- Iowa – Rodney Filer 1-yard run (Jeff Glas kick), 9:18
- Iowa – Larry Kendrick 16-yard pass from Ryan Vena (Jeff Glas kick), 6:42
- Utah – Jermaine Carpenter 17-yard pass from Brett Elliott (Ben Scott kick), 1:26
- Iowa – Rodney Filer 7-yard run (Jeff Glas kick), 0:56
- Utah – Aaron Boone 3-yard pass from Brett Elliott (Ben Scott kick no good), 0:18
- Iowa – Jesse Schmidt 10-yard pass from Ryan Vena (Jeff Glas kick), 0:03

3rd quarter

- Utah – Aaron Boone 4-yard pass from Brett Elliott (Ben Scott kick no good), 7:21
- Iowa – Brian Villanueva 16-yard pass from Ryan Vena (Jeff Glas kick no good), 3:20

4th quarter

- Iowa – Jesse Schmidt 24-yard pass from Ryan Vena (Jeff Glas kick), 9:51
- Iowa – Ryan Vena 2-yard run (Jeff Glas kick no good), 2:41

Passing

- Utah – Brett Elliott: 24/49, 229 yards, 4 TD, 2 INT
- Iowa – Ryan Vena: 20/22, 245 yards, 7 TD

Rushing

- Utah – Jermaine Carpenter: 1 att, 9 yards
- Iowa – Ryan Vena: 3 att, 38 yards, 1 TD

Receiving

- Utah – Aaron Boone: 9 rec, 99 yards, 3 TD
- Iowa – Larry Kendrick: 7 rec, 93 yards, 2 TD

=== Week 14: at Dallas Vigilantes ===
| Quarter | 1 | 2 | 3 | 4 | Total |
|---|---|---|---|---|---|
| Barnstormers | 7 | 16 | 15 | 21 | 59 |
| Vigilantes | 14 | 3 | 7 | 14 | 38 |

at American Airlines Center, Dallas, Texas

- Date: July 2
- Game time: 8:30 pm EDT
- Game attendance: 4,126
- Referee: Mark Windham
- Recap

Game information

1st quarter

- Dallas – Derek Lee 7-yard pass from Collin Drafts (Mark Lewis kick), 12:12
- Iowa – Jesse Schmidt 39-yard pass from Ryan Vena (Jeff Glas kick), 10:56
- Dallas – Collin Drafts 1-yard run (Mark Lewis kick), 5:16

2nd quarter

- Iowa – Safety, 13:58
- Iowa – Jesse Schmidt 33-yard pass from Ryan Vena (Jeff Glas kick), 11:49
- Iowa – Ryan Vena 1-yard run (Jeff Glas kick), 1:27
- Dallas – Mark Lewis 36-yard field goal, 0:00

3rd quarter

- Iowa – Larry Kendrick 55-yard kickoff return (Tanner Varner run), 13:39
- Dallas – Kenny Henderson 4-yard pass from Collin Drafts (Mark Lewis kick), 2:49

4th quarter

- Iowa – Jesse Schmidt 17-yard pass from Ryan Vena (Jeff Glas kick), 12:56
- Dallas – Will Pettis 13-yard pass from Collin Drafts (Mark Lewis kick), 8:16
- Iowa – Ryan Vena 5-yard run (Jeff Glas kick), 7:19
- Iowa – Rodney Filer 1-yard run (Jeff Glas kick), 1:00
- Dallas – Collin Drafts 1-yard run (Mark Lewis kick), 0:09

Passing

- Iowa – Ryan Vena: 16/25, 217 yards, 4 TD, 1 INT
- Dallas – Collin Drafts: 20/40, 220 yards, 3 TD, 2 INT

Rushing

- Iowa – Rodney Filer: 7 att, 27 yards, 1 TD
- Dallas – Duke Pettijohn: 1 att, 2 yards

Receiving

- Iowa – Jesse Schmidt: 7 rec, 127 yards, 3 TD
- Dallas – Kenny Henderson: 5 rec, 79 yards, 1 TD

=== Week 15: at Oklahoma City Yard Dawgz ===
| Quarter | 1 | 2 | 3 | 4 | Total |
|---|---|---|---|---|---|
| Barnstormers | 7 | 14 | 7 | 14 | 42 |
| Yard Dawgz | 14 | 14 | 3 | 21 | 52 |

at Cox Convention Center, Oklahoma City, Oklahoma

- Date: July 10
- Game time: 8:05 pm EDT
- Game attendance: 5,415
- Referee: Ron Torbert
- Recap^{[usurped]}

Game information

1st quarter

- Iowa – Ryan Vena 1-yard run (Tanner Varner kick), 8:22
- Oklahoma City – Timon Marshall 14-yard pass from Tommy Grady (Michael Salerno kick), 4:40
- Oklahoma City – Fred Shaw 50-yard interception return (Michael Salerno kick), 0:20

2nd quarter

- Oklahoma City – Chad Cook 2-yard run (Michael Salerno kick), 8:49
- Iowa – Jesse Schmidt 5-yard pass from Ryan Vena (Jeff Glas kick), 4:24
- Iowa – Larry Kendrick 16-yard pass from Ryan Vena (Jeff Glas kick), 0:21
- Oklahoma City – Jerel Myers 13-yard pass from Tommy Grady (Michael Salerno kick), 0:02

3rd quarter

- Oklahoma City – Michael Salerno 15-yard field goal, 7:10
- Iowa – Larry Kendrick 18-yard pass from Ryan Vena (Jeff Glas kick), 2:07

4th quarter

- Oklahoma City – Timon Marshall 22-yard pass from Tommy Grady (Michael Salerno kick), 14:12
- Iowa – Larry Kendrick 24-yard pass from Ryan Vena (Jeff Glas kick), 13:06
- Oklahoma City – Jeremy Ashcroft 5-yard pass from Tommy Grady (Michael Salerno kick), 9:20
- Iowa – Jesse Schmidt 13-yard pass from Ryan Vena (Jeff Glas kick), 4:00
- Oklahoma City – Timon Marshall 26-yard pass from Tommy Grady (Michael Salerno kick), 0:56

Passing

- Iowa – Ryan Vena: 26/38, 310 yards, 5 TD, 2 INT
- Oklahoma City – Tommy Grady: 29/41, 291 yards, 5 TD

Rushing

- Iowa – Rodney Filer: 3 att, 22 yards
- Oklahoma City – Chad Cook: 8 att, 9 yards, 1 TD

Receiving

- Iowa – Larry Kendrick: 9 rec, 121 yards, 3 TD
- Oklahoma City – Timon Marshall: 13 rec, 151 yards, 3 TD

=== Week 16: vs. Spokane Shock ===
| Quarter | 1 | 2 | 3 | 4 | Total |
|---|---|---|---|---|---|
| Shock | 13 | 14 | 14 | 7 | 48 |
| Barnstormers | 7 | 14 | 7 | 14 | 42 |

at Wells Fargo Arena, Des Moines, Iowa

- Date: July 16
- Game time: 8:05 pm EDT
- Game attendance: 9,164
- Referee: Brad Van Vark
- Recap

Game information

1st quarter

- Spokane – Huey Whittaker 5-yard pass from Kyle Rowley (Taylor Rowan kick no good), 11:23
- Spokane – Kyle Rowley 9-yard run (Taylor Rowan kick), 3:17
- Iowa – Jesse Schmidt 28-yard pass from Ryan Vena (Jeff Glas kick), 0:27

2nd quarter

- Spokane – Shaun Kauleinamoku 21-yard pass from Kyle Rowley (Taylor Rowan kick), 12:47
- Spokane – Huey Whittaker 15-yard pass from Kyle Rowley (Taylor Rowan kick), 0:57
- Iowa – Rodney Filer 11-yard kickoff return (Jeff Glas kick), 0:55
- Iowa – Jesse Schmidt 13-yard pass from Ryan Vena (Jeff Glas kick), 0:00

3rd quarter

- Iowa – Jesse Schmidt 38-yard pass from Ryan Vena (Jeff Glas kick), 13:33
- Spokane – Shaun Kauleinamoku 34-yard pass from Kyle Rowley (Taylor Rowan kick), 9:20
- Spokane – Huey Whittaker 4-yard pass from Kyle Rowley (Taylor Rowan kick), 2:58

4th quarter

- Iowa – Rodney Filer 1-yard run (Jeff Glas kick), 13:05
- Spokane – Markee White 6-yard pass from Kyle Rowley (Taylor Rowan kick), 8:31
- Iowa – Errick McCown 5-yard pass from Ryan Vena (Jeff Glas kick), 0:55
- Spokane – Kyle Rowley: 26/37, 299 yards, 6 TD
- Iowa – Ryan Vena: 18/32, 209 yards, 4 TD

Rushing

- Spokane – Kyle Rowley: 4 att, 12 yards, 1 TD
- Iowa – Rodney Filer: 5 att, 21 yards, 1 TD

Receiving

- Spokane – Huey Whittaker: 11 rec, 104 yards, 3 TD
- Iowa – Jesse Schmidt: 10 rec, 148 yards, 3 TD

=== Week 17: vs. Milwaukee Iron ===
| Quarter | 1 | 2 | 3 | 4 | Total |
|---|---|---|---|---|---|
| Iron | 21 | 14 | 13 | 27 | 75 |
| Barnstormers | 21 | 20 | 6 | 20 | 67 |

at Wells Fargo Arena, Des Moines, Iowa

- Date: July 24
- Game time: 8:05 pm EDT
- Game attendance: 10,190
- Referee: Brad Van Vark
- Recap

Game information

1st quarter

- Milwaukee – Damian Harrell 17-yard pass from Chris Greisen (Robert Forstrom kick), 13:19
- Iowa – Rodney Filer 1-yard run (Jeff Glas kick), 9:39
- Milwaukee – Damian Harrell 18-yard pass from Chris Greisen (Robert Forstrom kick), 6:36
- Iowa – Jesse Schmidt 38-yard pass from Ryan Vena (Jeff Glas kick), 5:41
- Milwaukee – Anthony Jones 33-yard pass from Chris Greisen (Robert Forstrom kick), 3:06
- Iowa – Ryan Vena 1-yard run (Jeff Glas kick), 0:00

2nd quarter

- Iowa – Tanner Varner 56-yard interception return (Tanner Varner pass no good), 9:42
- Milwaukee – Raymond McNeil 0-yard run (Robert Forstrom kick), 6:53
- Iowa – Errick McCown 5-yard pass from Ryan Vena (Jeff Glas kick), 2:40
- Milwaukee – Tyre Young 2-yard run (Robert Forstrom kick), 0:33
- Iowa – Jesse Schmidt 17-yard pass from Ryan Vena (Jeff Glas kick), 0:08

3rd quarter

- Milwaukee – Anthony Jones 16-yard pass from Chris Greisen (Robert Forstrom kick), 10:59
- Milwaukee – Anthony Jones 2-yard run (Robert Forstrom kick no good), 8:33
- Iowa – Rodney Filer 5-yard run (Jeff Glas kick no good), 1:24

4th quarter

- Milwaukee – Damian Harrell 9-yard pass from Chris Greisen (Robert Forstrom kick), 12:57
- Milwaukee – Antoine Burns 10-yard pass from Chris Greisen (Robert Forstrom kick no good), 6:57
- Iowa – Larry Kendrick 3-yard pass from Ryan Vena (Jeff Glas kick), 2:02
- Milwaukee – Antoine Burns 27-yard pass from Chris Greisen (Robert Forstrom kick), 1:00
- Iowa – Larry Kendrick 11-yard pass from Ryan Vena (Jeff Glas kick), 0:35
- Milwaukee – Damian Harrell 22-yard pass from Chris Greisen (Robert Forstrom kick), 0:22
- Iowa – Errick McCown 9-yard pass from Ryan Vena (Ryan Vena pass no good), 0:00

Passing

- Milwaukee – Chris Greisen: 30/40, 413 yards, 8 TD, 2 INT
- Iowa – Ryan Vena: 28/33, 332 yards, 6 TD, 1 INT

Rushing

- Milwaukee – Anthony Jones: 2 att, 6 yards, 1 TD
- Iowa – Rodney Filer: 4 att, 14 yards, 2 TD

Receiving

- Milwaukee – Damian Harrell: 11 rec, 156 yards, 4 TD
- Iowa – Larry Kendrick: 12 rec, 119 yards, 2 TD

=== Week 18: at Arizona Rattlers ===
| Quarter | 1 | 2 | 3 | 4 | Total |
|---|---|---|---|---|---|
| Barnstormers | 13 | 16 | 7 | 31 | 67 |
| Rattlers | 14 | 13 | 7 | 13 | 47 |

at US Airways Center, Phoenix, Arizona

- Date: July 31
- Game time: 10:30 pm EDT
- Game attendance: 10,420
- Referee: Shawn Hochuli
- Recap
