= 2007 Louisiana–Lafayette Ragin' Cajuns football team =

American college football season

2007 Louisiana–Lafayette Ragin' Cajuns football
- Conference: Sun Belt Conference
- Record: 3–9 (3–4 Sun Belt)
- Head coach: Rickey Bustle (6th season)
- Offensive coordinator: Blake Anderson (1st season)
- Offensive scheme: Multiple
- Defensive coordinator: Kevin Fouquier (1st season)
- Base defense: Multiple
- Home stadium: Cajun Field

2007 Sun Belt Conference football standings
	Conf.			Overall
Team	W		L	W		L
Florida Atlantic +	6	–	1	8	–	5
Troy +	6	–	1	8	–	4
Middle Tennessee	4	–	3	5	–	7
Louisiana–Monroe	4	–	3	6	–	6
Arkansas State	3	–	4	5	–	7
Louisiana–Lafayette	3	–	4	3	–	9
FIU	1	–	6	1	–	11
North Texas	1	–	6	2	–	10
+ – Conference co-champions

The 2007 Louisiana–Lafayette Ragin' Cajuns football team represented the University of Louisiana at Lafayette in the 2007 NCAA Division I FBS football season. The Ragin' Cajuns were led by sixth-year head coach Rickey Bustle and played their home games at Cajun Field. The Ragin' Cajuns finished the season with a record of 3–9 overall and 3–4 in Sun Belt Conference play.

== Preseason ==
=== Award Watchlist ===
Award	Player	Position	Year
Lou Groza Award	Drew Edminston	PK	JR

=== Sun Belt Media Day ===
==== Preseason All-Conference Team ====
Offense

RB Tyrell Fenroy
OT Jesse Newman

Special teams

PK Drew Edmiston

== Roster ==
2007 Louisiana-Lafayette Ragin' Cajuns football team roster
Players
Coaches
Offense

Pos.	#	Name	Class
QB	3	John Hundley	So
WR	5	Jason Chery	Jr
QB	6	Michael Desormeaux	Jr
WR	7	Caleb Rubin	Jr
QB	10	Connor Morel	Sr
QB	11	Chris Masson	Fr
WR	15	Verlin Moore	Fr
QB	16	Brad McGuire	Fr
WR	17	Jordan Jackson	Sr
WR	18	Derrick Smith	Jr
WR	19	Marlin Miller	Fr
FB	22	Abdule Levier	Sr
WR	23	Chad Fontenot	Jr
WR	24	Phillip Nevels	So
RB	31	Deon Wallace	So
RB	32	Tyrell Fenroy	Jr
RB	33	Julian Shankle	Fr
RB	40	Matt Dupre	So
FB	45	Chancellor Roberson	Jr
FB	46	Matt Desormeaux	Fr
OT	51	Colin Windsor	Fr
OT	55	Brad Bryant	So
G	56	William Chance	Sr
G	58	Junior Ramos	Sr
C	60	Ian Burks	Fr
G	61	Bobby Fails	Jr
OT	62	Eric Benoit	Jr
G	64	Jaron Odom	Fr
G	64	Ryan Plummer	Fr
OT	66	Nasser Jamal	Fr
OT	67	Jesse Newman	Sr
OT	68	Matthew Autrey	Fr
TE	68	Dusty Mack	So
G	70	Zachary Leger	Sr
G	72	Jordan Folse	Fr
OT	73	Jonathan DeCoster	Fr
OT	74	Kyle Plouhar	Fr
G	75	Brad Bustle	So
OT	76	Damian Jones	Sr
G	77	Lanier Coleman	Sr
OT	78	Kyle Pirtle	So
C	79	Chris Fisher	So
WR	80	Darrius Duffy	So
WR	81	Richie Falgout	Fr
WR	82	Ray Givens	Sr
WR	83	Ryan Finney	Jr
WR	84	Louis Lee	So
WR	85	Luke Aubrey	So
TE	86	Matt Ulm	So
TE	87	Kevin Belton	Sr
TE	88	Erik Jones	Jr
WR	89	Lance Kelley	Fr
TE	90	Quent Evans	Jr
TE	98	Keith Talamo	Sr
WR		Chad Fontenot	Jr
RB		Jarrell Grnat	Fr
WR		Jawanza Mitchell	Fr
G		Josh Robinson	Fr
WR		Julian Shankle	Fr
FB		Jonathan Thomas	Fr

Defense

Pos.	#	Name	Class
CB	2	Jarrett Jones	Sr
LB	4	Mark Risher	Sr
FS	8	Lamar Morgan	Sr
CB	13	Scooter Rogers	Jr
SS	20	Derik Keyes	Sr
CB	21	Torres Kingsby	Sr
CB	23	Junior Jean	So
CB	25	Frantz Accime	Fr
CB	26	Kyle Ward	Sr
LB	27	Phillip Walker	So
LB	29	Jonathon Vance	Jr
FS	30	Gerren Blount	So
CB	33	Justin Branden	Jr
FS	34	Justin Lee	Jr
CB	35	Calvin Moore	So
FS	36	Maurice Rolle	Fr
CB	37	Orkeys Auriene	Fr
SS	38	Daylon McCoy	Fr
LB	41	Antwyne Zanders	Jr
LB	43	Brenton Burkhalter	Jr
DE	44	Greg Hathorn	Sr
LB	47	Grant Fleming	Fr
DE	50	Jeremy Cook	Fr
LB	52	Tre' Green	Sr
LB	53	Jezreel Washington	So
LB	57	Fred Davis	Fr
DT	59	Jermaine Rogers	Fr
DT	69	Norris Gray	So
DT	71	Jordan Hanby	Fr
DE	90	Rodney Hardeway	Sr
DT	91	Sharrick Moore	Fr
DE	92	Chris Johnson	Fr
DE	93	Hall Davis	So
DT	94	Korey Raymond	Sr
DT	95	LaQuincy Williams	So
DE	96	Chris Lanaux	So
DE	97	Terrell Richardson	Fr
DT	99	Seth Adams	Jr
FS		Fabian Adams	Fr
LB		Richard Brooks	Fr
DE		Kyle Cox	Fr
LB		Renaldo Delcambre	Jr
LB		Nate Douglas	Fr
LB		Trae Fitzgerald	Fr
CB		Ross Goodlett	Fr
LB		Matt Lafeaux	Fr
LB		Geoffrey McCullough	So
LB		Blake Ramsey	So
SS		Michael Shultz	Sr

Special teams

Pos.	#	Name	Class
P	35	Spencer Ortego	Fr
K	48	Drew Edminston	Jr
P	49	Tyler Albrecht	Fr
LS	54	Scott Hayes	So
K		Josh Ardoin	Fr

Head coach

- Rickey Bustle (Clemson)

Coordinators/assistant coaches

- Blake Anderson (Sam Houston State)
  Offensive coordinator
- Kevin Fouquier (Texas A&M)
  Defensive coordinator
- Troy Wingerter (Louisiana)
  Assistant head coach

Legend

- (C) Team captain
- (S) Suspended
- (I) Ineligible
- Injured
- Redshirt

Roster
Last update: February 7, 2019

== Schedule ==
Date	Time	Opponent	Site	TV	Result	Attendance	Source
September 1	6:00 pm	at South Carolina*	Williams-Brice Stadium; Columbia, South Carolina	PPV	L 14–28	78,234	
September 8	6:00 pm	Ohio*	Cajun Field; Lafayette, Louisiana		L 23–31	22,186	
September 15	6:00 pm	No. 8 (FCS) McNeese State*	Cajun Field; Lafayette, Louisiana (Cajun Crown)		L 17–38	33,828	
September 22	6:00 pm	Troy	Cajun Field; Lafayette, Louisiana	ESPN+	L 31–48	14,091	
September 29	5:00 pm	at UCF*	Bright House Networks Stadium; Orlando, Florida		L 19–37	42,646	
October 6	6:00 pm	North Texas	Cajun Field; Lafayette, Louisiana		W 38–29	9,464	
October 13	6:00 pm	at Arkansas State	ASU Stadium; Jonesboro, Arkansas		L 21–52	18,242	
October 20	4:00 pm	Florida Atlantic^{†}	Cajun Field; Lafayette, Louisiana	CSS	L 32–39 ^{OT}	12,290	
November 3	3:00 pm	at No. 24 Tennessee*	Neyland Stadium; Knoxville, Tennessee		L 7–59	96,197	
November 10	2:30 pm	at Middle Tennessee	Johnny "Red" Floyd Stadium; Murfreesboro, Tennessee		W 34–24	19,227	
November 17	6:00 pm	at FIU	Miami Orange Bowl; Miami		W 38–28	5,734	
November 24	6:00 pm	Louisiana–Monroe	Cajun Field; Lafayette, Louisiana (Battle on the Bayou)		L 11–17	8,045	
*Non-conference game; ^{†}Homecoming; Rankings from Coaches' Poll released prior to the game; All times are in Central time

- Source: RaginCajuns.com: 2007 football schedule

== Game summaries ==
=== @ South Carolina ===
Louisiana-Lafayette at South Carolina – Game summary

Quarter	1	2	3	4	Total
Ragin' Cajuns	7	7	0	0	14
Gamecocks	14	7	7	0	28

at Williams-Brice Stadium, Columbia, SC

- Date: September 1
- Game time: 6:00 p.m. CST
- Game weather: 85 °F (29 °C); partly cloudy
- Game attendance: 78,234
- Referee: Ken Williamson
- TV: PPV

Game information

First quarter

- SC - Andy Boyd 2-yard TD pass from Chris Smelley, Ryan Succop kick good, 12:04 (SC 7-0)
- SC - Kenny McKinley 19-yard TD pass from Tommy Beecher, Succop kick good, 9:33 (SC 14-0)
- ULL - Michael Desormeaux 14-yard TD run, Drew Edmiston kick good, 0:15 (SC 14-7)

Second quarter

- ULL - Chancellor Roberson 3-yard TD run, Edmiston kick good, 8:46 (TIE 14-14)
- SC - Cory Boyd 2-yard TD run, Succop kick good, 0:24 (SC 21-14)

Third quarter

- SC - Boyd 4-yard TD run, Succop kick good, 4:54 (SC 28-14)

Top passers

- SC - Tommy Beecher - 11/15, 137 yards, TD
- ULL - Michael Desormeaux - 12/19, 63 yards

Top rushers

- SC - Mike Davis - 15 carries, 94 yards
- ULL - Michael Desormeaux - 21 yards, 116 yards, TD

Top receivers

- SC - Andy Boyd - 3 receptions, 48 yards, TD
- ULL - Derrick Smith - 3 receptions, 37 yardss

=== Ohio ===
Ohio at Louisiana-Lafayette – Game summary

Quarter	1	2	3	4	Total
Bobcats	7	3	7	14	31
Ragin' Cajuns	6	14	3	0	23

at Cajun Field, Lafayette, LA

- Date: September 8
- Game time: 6:00 p.m. CST
- Game attendance: 22,186

Game information

First quarter

- ULL - Jason Chery 23-yard TD pass from Richie Falgout, Drew Edmiston kick good, 12:36 (ULL 6-0)
- OHIO - Kalvin McRae 44-yard TD pass from Brad Bower, Michael Braunstein kick good, 10:12 (OHIO 7-6)

Second quarter

- ULL - Jordan Jackson 16-yard TD pass from Michael Desormeaux, Edmiston kick good, 10:24 (ULL 13-7)
- OHIO - Braunstein 27-yard field goal, 7:33 (ULL 13-10)
- ULL - Abdule Levier 12-yard TD pass from Desormeaux, Edmiston kick good, 1:03 (ULL 20-10)

Third quarter

- OHIO - McRae 5-yard TD run, Braunstein kick good, 3:32 (ULL 20-17)
- ULL - Edmiston 28-yard field goal, 0:12 (ULL 23-17)

Fourth quarter

- OHIO - McRae 23-yard TD run, Braunstein kick good, 14:34 (OHIO 24-23)
- OHIO - McRae 13-yard TD run, Braunstein kick good, 4:32 (OHIO 31-23)

Top passers

- OHIO - Brad Bower - 17/28, 264 yards, TD, INT
- ULL - Michael Desormeaux - 16/26, 234 yards, 2 TD

Top rushers

- OHIO - Kalvin McRae - 20 carries, 84 yards, 3 TD
- ULL - Tyrell Fenroy - 24 carries, 136 yards

Top receivers

- OHIO - Justin Fitzgerald - reception, 64 yards
- ULL - Derreck Smith - 4 receptions, 99 yards

=== McNeese State ===
McNeese State at Louisiana-Lafayette – Game summary

Quarter	1	2	3	4	Total
Cowboys	3	21	7	7	38
Ragin' Cajuns	7	10	0	0	17

at Cajun Field, Lafayette, LA

- Date: September 15
- Game time: 6:00 p.m. CST
- Game attendance: 33,828

Game information

First quarter

- MCNS - Blake Bercegeay 45-yard field goal, 5:24 (MCNS 3-0)
- ULL - Tyrell Fenroy 5-yard TD run, Drew Edmiston kick good, 3:48 (ULL 7-3)

Second quarter

- MCNS - Allen Nelson fumble lateraled to Bryant Mason return for 87 yards TD, Bercegeay kick good, 10:31 (MCNS 10-7)
- MCNS - Kris Bush 4-yard TD run, Bercegeay kick good, 8:30 (MCNS 17-7)
- ULL - Edmiston 37-yard field goal, 4:14 (MCNS 17-10)
- ULL - Derrick Smith 18-yard TD pass from Michael Desormeaux, Edmiston kick good, 1:32 (TIE 17-17)
- MCNS - Carlese Franklin 22-yard TD pass from Derrick Fourroux, Bercegeay kick good, 0:17 (MCNS 24-17)

Third quarter

- MCNS - Bush 3-yard TD run, Bercegeay kick good, 2:10 (MCNS 31-17)

Fourth quarter

- MCNS - Jamie Leonard 12-yard TD run, Bercegeay kick good, 5:47 (MCNS 38-17)

Top passers

- MCNS - Derrick Fourroux - 11/19, 139 yards, TD, 2 INT
- ULL - Michael Desormeaux - 11/24, 162 yards, TD, 4 INT

Top rushers

- MCNS - Jamie Leonard - 19 carries, 134 yards, TD
- ULL - Tyrell Fenroy - 20 carries, 82 yards, TD

Top receivers

- MCNS - Carlese Franklin - 3 receptions, 57 yards, TD
- ULL - Derrick Smith - 4 receptions, 99 yards, TD

=== Troy ===
Troy at Louisiana-Lafayette – Game summary

Quarter	1	2	3	4	Total
Trojans	28	0	6	14	48
Ragin' Cajuns	17	0	7	7	31

at Cajun Field, Lafayette, LA

- Date: September 22
- Game time: 6:00 p.m. CST
- Game attendance: 14,091

Game information

First quarter

- ULL - Jason Chery 80-yard TD run, Drew Edmiston kick good, 14:40 (ULL 7-0)
- ULL - Deon Wallace 6-yard TD run, Edmiston kick good, 10:42 (ULL 14-0)
- TROY - Omar Haugabook 15-yard TD run, Greg Whibbs kick good, 8:13 (ULL 14-7)
- TROY - Kenny Cattouse 36-yard TD run, Whibbs kick good, 4:28 (TIE 14-14)
- ULL - Edmiston 40-yard field goal, 1:56 (ULL 17-14)

Second quarter

- TROY - Travis Boyd 4-yard TD pass from Haugabook, Whibbs kick good, 10:55 (TROY 21-17)

Third quarter

- TROY - Cornelius Williams 34-yard TD pass from Haugabook, Whibbs kick good, 12:57 (TROY 28-17)
- TROY - Cattouse 9-yard TD run, Whibbs kick no good, 8:55 (TROY 34-17)
- ULL - Kevin Bolton 1-yard TD pass from Michael Desormeaux, Edmiston kick good, 2:46 (TROY 34-24)

Fourth quarter

- TROY - Cattouse 8-yard TD run, Whibbs kick good, 12:54 (TROY 41-24)
- ULL - Abdule Levier 2-yard TD run, Edmiston kick good, 9:01 (TROY 41-31)
- TROY - Elbert Mack 39-yard interception returned for TD, Whibbs kick good, 5:23 (TROY 48-31)

Top passers

- TROY - Omar Haugabook - 30/43, 297 yards, 2 TD, INT
- ULL - Michael Desormeaux 20/38, 158 yards, TD, 2 INT

Top rushers

- TROY - Kenny Cattouse - 19 carries, 139 yards, 3 TD
- ULL - Michael Desormeaux - 21 carries, 159 yards

Top receivers

- TROY - Josh Allen - 7 receptions, 128 yards
- ULL - Derrick Smith - 6 receptions, 72 yards

=== @ UCF ===
Louisiana-Lafayette at UCF – Game summary

Quarter	1	2	3	4	Total
Ragin' Cajuns	3	3	7	6	19
Knights	10	20	7	0	37

at Bright House Networks Stadium, Orlando, FL

- Date: September 29
- Game time: 5:00 p.m. CST
- Game weather: 78 °F (26 °C); cloudy
- Game attendance: 42,646
- Referee: Matt Leoffler

Game information

First quarter

- UCF - Robert Batista 41-yard field goal, 11:16 (UCF 3-0)
- UCF - Kevin Smith 56-yard TD run, Batista kick good, 6:56 (UCF 10-0)
- ULL - Drew Edmiston 26-yard field goal, 1:09 (UCF 10-3)

Second quarter

- UCF - Smith 1-yard TD run, Batista kick no good, 14:14 (UCF 16-3)
- ULL - Edmiston 22-yard field goal, 10:20 (UCF 16-6)
- UCF - Smith 1-yard TD run, Michael Torres kick good, 1:20 (UCF 23-6)
- UCF - Augustus Ashley punt block returned for TD, Torres kick good, 0:09 (UCF 30-6)

Third quarter

- ULL - Marlin Miller 3-yard TD run, Edmiston kick good, 14:42 (UCF 30-13)
- UCF - Corey Rabazinski 1-yard TD pass from Kyle Israel, Torres kick good, 7:13 (UCF 37-13)

Fourth quarter

- ULL - Derrick Smith 28-yard TD pass from Michael Desormeaux, 12:52 (UCF 37-19)

Top passers

- UCF - Kyle Israel - 11/20, 153 yards, TD
- ULL - Michael Desormeaux - 14/29, 154 yards, TD

Top rushers

- UCF - Kevin Smith - 33 carries, 223 yards, 3 TD
- ULL - Michael Desormeaux - 19 carries, 92 yards

Top receivers

- UCF - Rocky Ross - 6 receptions, 83 yards
- ULL - Derrick Smith - 3 receptions, 88 yards, TD

=== North Texas ===
North Texas at Louisiana-Lafayette – Game summary

Quarter	1	2	3	4	Total
Mean Green	0	12	7	10	29
Ragin' Cajuns	7	7	14	10	38

at Cajun Field, Lafayette, LA

- Date: October 6
- Game time: 6:00 p.m. CST
- Game attendance: 9,464

Game information

First quarter

- ULL - Derrick Smith 24-yard TD pass from Michael Desormeaux, Drew Edmiston kick good, 7:45 (ULL 7-0)

Second quarter

- UNT - Brock Stickler fumble recovered in endzone for TD, Thomas Moreland kick no good, 11:16 (ULL 7-6)
- ULL - Abdule Levier 43-yard TD run, Edmiston kick good, 10:20 (ULL 14-6)
- UNT - Casey Fitzgerald 39-yard TD pass from Giovanni Vizza, Moreland kick no good, 7:14 (ULL 14-12)

Third quarter

- ULL - Desormeaux 73-yard TD run, Edmiston kick good, 14:35 (ULL 21-12)
- UNT - Stickler 8-yard TD pass from Vizza, Moreland kick good, 7:33 (ULL 21-19)
- ULL - Kevin Belton 3-yard TD pass from Desormeaux, Edmiston kick good, 0:02 (ULL 28-19)

Fourth quarter

- UNT - Fitzgerald 27-yard TD pass from Vizza, Moreland kick good, 11:11 (ULL 28-26)
- ULL - Desormeaux 4-yard TD run, Edmiston kick good, 7:16 (ULL 35-26)
- UNT - Moreland 36-yard field goal, 2:55 (ULL 35-29)
- ULL - Edmiston 22-yard field goal, 1:16 (ULL 38-29)

Top passers

- ULL - Michael Desormeaux - 10/20, 114 yards, 2 TD
- UNT - Giovanni Vizza - 35/57, 383 yards, 3 TD, 3 INT

Top rushers

- ULL - Michael Desormeaux - 18 carries, 150 yards, 2 TD
- UNT - Jamario Thomas - 13 carries, 60 yards

Top receivers

- ULL - Derrick Smith - 4 receptions, 80 yards, TD
- UNT - Casey Fitzgerald - 14 receptions, 131 yards, 2 TD

=== @ Arkansas State ===
Louisiana-Lafayette at Arkansas State – Game summary

Quarter	1	2	3	4	Total
Ragin' Cajuns	7	14	0	10	31
Indians	7	24	14	7	52

at ASU Stadium, Jonesboro, AR

- Date: October 13
- Game time: 6:00 p.m. CST
- Game weather: 76 °F (24 °C); clear
- Game attendance: 18,242
- Referee: Ken Williamson

Game information

First quarter

- ULL - Daylon McCoy 40-yard fumble returned for TD, Drew Edmiston kick good, 12:18 (ULL 7-0)
- ARST - Corey Leonard 4-yard TD run, Josh Arauco kick good, 8:41 (TIE 7-7)

Second quarter

- ARST - Arauco 28-yard field goal, 10:18 (ARST 10-7)
- ARST - David Johnson 84-yard TD pass from Leonard, Arauco kick good, 8:56 (ARST 17-7)
- ULL - Michael Desormeaux 64-yard TD run, Edmiston kick good, 7:43 (ARST 17-14)
- ARST - Johnson 4-yard TD pass from Leonard, Arauco kick good, 4:55 (ARST 24-14)
- ULL - Jason Chery 64-yard TD pass from Desormeaux, Edmiston kick good, 4:03 (ARST 24-21)
- ARST - Levi DeJohnette 6-yard TD pass from Leonard, Arauco kick good, 0:30 (ARST 31-21)

Third quarter

- ARST - Vernon Catlin 29-yard TD pass from Leonard, Arauco kick good, 8:43 (ARST 38-21)
- ARST - Cedric Wilkerson 10-yard TD pass from Leonard, Arauco kick good, 2:40 (ARST 45-21)

Fourth quarter

- ARST - Reggie Arnold 16-yard TD run, Arauco kick good, 13:39 (ARST 52-21)

Top passers

- ARST - Corey Leonard - 17/23, 275 yards, 5 TD
- ULL - Michael Desormeaux - 6/15, 100 yards, TD

Top rushers

- ARST - Reggie Arnold - 24 carries, 225 yards, TD
- ULL - Michael Desormeaux - 9 carries, 74 yards, TD

Top receivers

- ARST - David Johnson - 3 receptions, 93 yards, 2 TD
- ULL - Jason Chery - 2 receptions, 101 yards, TD

=== Florida Atlantic ===
Florida Atlantic at Louisiana-Lafayette – Game summary

Quarter	1	2	3	4	OT	Total
Owls	10	0	7	17	7	41
Ragin' Cajuns	0	9	9	14	0	32

at Cajun Field, Lafayette, LA

- Date: October 20
- Game time: 4:00 p.m. CST
- Game weather: 82 °F (28 °C); clear
- Game attendance: 12,290
- Referee: Rick Doan

Game information

First quarter

- FAU - Warley Leroy 33-yard field goal, 11:12 (FAU 3-0)
- FAU - Jason Harmon 12-yard TD pass from Rusty Smith, Leroy kick good, 2:17 (FAU 10-0)

Second quarter

- ULL - Drew Edmiston 31-yard field goal, 11:48 (FAU 10-3)
- ULL - Michael Desormeaux 19-yard TD run, Edmiston kick no good, 0:19 (FAU 10-9)

Third quarter

- FAU - Chris Bonner 30-yard TD pass from Smith, Leroy kick good, 9:20 (FAU 17-9)
- ULL - Edmiston 27-yard field goal, 5:47 (FAU 17-12)
- ULL - Jarrett Jones 53-yard blocked field goal returned for TD, Desormeaux two-point conversion pass no good, 3:19 (ULL 18-17)

Fourth quarter

- FAU - William Rose 1-yard TD pass from Smith, Smith two-point conversion pass good to Dilvory Edgecomb, 13:14 (FAU 25-18)
- ULL - Chancellor Roberson 1-yard TD run, Edmiston kick good, 7:47 (TIE 25-25)
- ULL - Desormeaux 32-yard TD run, Edmiston kick good, 1:03 (ULL 32-25)
- FAU - Cortez Gent 17-yard TD pass from Smith, Leroy kick good, 0:07 (TIE 32-32)

First overtime

- FAU - Charles Pierre 1-yard TD run, Leroy kick good, (FAU 38-32)

Top passers

- FAU - Rusty Smith - 26/45, 308 yards, 4 TD
- ULL - Michael Desormeaux - 14/22, 121 yards, INT

Top rushers

- FAU - Charles Pierre - 16 carries, 93 yards, TD
- ULL - Michael Desormeaux - 23 carries, 145 yards, 2 TD

Top receivers

- FAU - Cortez Gent - 5 receptions, 82 yards, TD
- ULL - Derrick Smith - 7 receptions, 75 yards

=== @ Tennessee ===
Louisiana-Lafayette at Tennessee – Game summary

Quarter	1	2	3	4	Total
Ragin' Cajuns	0	0	7	0	7
No. 24 Volunteers	3	21	21	14	59

at Neyland Stadium, Knoxville, TN

- Date: November 3
- Game time: 3:00 p.m. CST
- Game weather: 64 °F (18 °C); clear
- Game attendance: 96,197
- Referee: Jeff Roberson

Game information

First quarter

- TENN - Daniel Lincoln 24-yard field goal, 8:50 (TENN 3-0)

Second quarter

- TENN - Arian Foster 1-yard TD run, Lincoln kick good, 14:38 (TENN 10-0)
- TENN - Foster 4-yard TD run, Lincoln kick good, 10:00 (TENN 17-0)
- TENN - Antonio Reynolds 70-yard interception returned for TD, Lincoln kick good, 1:50 (TENN 24-0)

Third quarter

- ULL - Tyrell Fenroy 21-yard TD run, Drew Edmiston kick good, 13:07 (TENN 24-7)
- TENN - Quintin Hancock 5-yard TD pass from Erik Ainge, Lincoln kick good, 7:59 (TENN 31-7)
- TENN - Antonio Wardlow 20-yard blocked punt returned for TD, Lincoln kick good, 6:42 (TENN 38-7)
- TENN - Lennon Creer 30-yard TD run, Lincoln kick good, 2:28 (TENN 45-7)

Fourth quarter

- TENN - Kenny O'Neal 49-yard TD pass from Jonathan Crompton, Lincoln kick good, 11:24 (TENN 52-7)
- TENN - Gerald Jones 12-yard TD run, Lincoln kick good, 4:36 (TENN 59-7)

Top passers

- TENN - Erik Ainge - 16/23, 125 yards, TD
- ULL - Michael Desormeaux - 13/25, 95 yards, INT

Top rushers

- TENN - Lennon Creer - 7 carries, 109 yards, TD
- ULL - Tyrell Fenroy - 14 carries, 113 yards, TD

Top receivers

- TENN - Lucas Taylor - 5 receptions, 51 yards
- ULL - Jason Chery - 7 receptions, 51 yards

=== @ Middle Tennessee ===
Louisiana-Lafayette at Middle Tennessee – Game summary

Quarter	1	2	3	4	Total
Ragin' Cajuns	0	14	7	13	34
Blue Raiders	7	14	3	0	24

at Johnny "Red" Floyd Stadium, Murfreesboro, TN

- Date: November 10
- Game time: 2:30 p.m. CST
- Game weather: 58 °F (14 °C); partly sunny
- Game attendance: 19,227
- Referee: Perry Havener

Game information

First quarter

- MTSU - Jonathan Grigsby 11-yard TD pass from Joe Craddock, David DeFatta kick good, 8:18 (MTSU 7-0)

Second quarter

- MTSU - Taron Henry 32-yard TD pass from Craddock, DeFatta kick good, 13:59 (MTSU 14-0)
- ULL - Deon Wallace 1-yard TD run, Drew Edmiston kick good, 10:46 (MTSU 14-7)
- ULL - Tyrell Fenroy 2-yard TD run, Edmiston kick good, 7:39 (TIE 14-14)
- MTSU - DeMarco McNair 1-yard TD run, DeFatta kick good, 1:35 (MTSU 21-14)

Third quarter

- ULL - Kevin Belton 4-yard TD pass from Michael Desormeaux, Edmiston kick good, 10:59 (TIE 21-21)
- MTSU - DeFatta 20-yard field goal, 6:40 (MTSU 24-21)

Fourth quarter

- ULL - Wallace 52-yard TD pass from Desormeaux, Edmiston kick good, 10:57 (ULL 28-24)
- ULL - Jason Chery 31-yard TD run, Edmiston kick good, 8:27 (ULL 34-24)

Top passers

- ULL - Michael Desormeaux - 13/20, 152 yards, 2 TD, 2 INT
- MTSU - Joe Craddock - 8/11, 89 yards, 2 TD

Top rushers

- ULL - Michael Desormeaux - 19 carries, 175 yards
- MTSU - Desmond Gee - 8 carries, 77 yards

Top receivers

- ULL - Tyrell Fenroy - 3 receptions, 26 yards
- MTSU - Patrick Honeycutt - 4 receptions, 2 yards

=== @ Florida International ===
Louisiana-Lafayette at Florida International – Game summary

Quarter	1	2	3	4	Total
Ragin' Cajuns	14	14	7	3	38
Golden Panthers	14	7	0	7	28

at Miami Orange Bowl, Miami, FL

- Date: November 17
- Game time: 6:00 p.m. CST
- Game weather: 71 °F (22 °C); partly cloudy
- Game attendance: 5,734
- Referee: Rick Doan

Game information

First quarter

- FIU - Jeremy Dicken 13-yard TD pass from Wayne Younger, Chris Abed kick no good, 10:27 (FIU 6-0)
- ULL - Tyrell Fenroy 4-yard TD run, Drew Edmiston kick good, 6:34 (ULL 7-6)
- ULL - Michael Desormeaux 6-yard TD run, Edmiston kick good, 2:34 (ULL 14-6)
- FIU - A'mod Ned 60-yard TD run, Younger two-point conversion pass good to Elliott Dix, 1:27 (TIE 14-14)

Second quarter

- FIU - Younger 32-yard TD run, Abed kick good, 14:35 (FIU 21-14)
- ULL - Deon Wallace 3-yard TD run, Edmiston kick good, 7:31 (TIE 21-21)
- ULL - Wallace 17-yard TD pass from Connor Morel, Edmiston kick good, 1:22 (ULL 28-21)

Third quarter

- ULL - Fenroy 1-yard TD run, Edmiston kick good, 4:30 (ULL 35-21)

Fourth quarter

- FIU - John Ellis 4-yard TD pass from Younger, Abed kick good, 13:34 (ULL 35-28)
- ULL - Edmiston 37-yard field goal, 1:20 (ULL 38-28)

Top passers

- ULL - Connor Morel - 12/15, 125 yards, TD
- FIU - Wayne Younger - 11/19, 127 yards, 2 TD

Top rushers

- ULL - Tyrell Fenroy - 28 carries, 150 yards, 2 TD
- FIU - A'mod Ned - 20 carries, 155 yards, TD

Top receivers

- ULL - Jason Chery - 4 receptions, 36 yards
- FIU - Greg Ellingson - 2 receptions, 47 yards

=== Louisiana-Monroe ===
Louisiana-Monroe at Louisiana-Lafayette – Game summary

Quarter	1	2	3	4	Total
Warhawks	7	0	7	3	17
Ragin' Cajuns	0	3	8	0	11

at Cajun Field, Lafayette, LA

- Date: November 24
- Game time: 6:00 p.m. CST
- Game weather: 47 °F (8 °C); rain showers
- Game attendance: 8,045
- Referee: Rick Doan

Game information

First quarter

- ULM - Greg James 60-yard interception returned for TD, Cole Wilson kick good, 9:51 (ULM 7-0)

Second quarter

- ULL - Drew Edmiston 18-yard field goal, 0:00 (ULM 7-3)

Third quarter

- ULM - Kinsmon Lancaster 3-yard TD run, Wilson kick good, 11:13 (ULM 14-3)
- ULL - Tyrell Fenroy 42-yard TD run, Connor Morel two-point conversion pass good to Erik Jones, 0:43 (ULM 14-11)

Fourth quarter

- ULM - Wilson 28-yard field goal, 7:43 (ULM 17-11)

Top passers

- ULM - Kinsmon Lancaster - 11/19, 99 yards
- ULL - Connor Morel - 19/37, 240 yards, INT

Top rushers

- ULM - Calvin Dawson - 27 carries, 66 yards
- ULL - Tyrell Fenroy - 19 carries, 118 yards, TD

Top receivers

- ULM - Zeek Zacharie - 3 receptions, 30 yards
- ULL - Jason Chery 7 receptions, 107 yards

== Postseason ==
=== All–Conference Team ===
First-Team Offense

RB Tyrell Fenroy
OL Jesse Newman

First-Team Defense

DE Rodney Hardeway

Second-Team Offense

C Chris Fisher

Second-Team Defense

Antwyne Zanders

Second-Time Special Teams

K Drew Edmiston
AP Michael Desormeaux

Honorable Mentions

LB Grant Fleming
DL Corey Raymond

=== Post-Season Awards ===
- Rusty Smith, FAU - Player of the Year
- Omar Haugabook, TROY - Offensive Player of the Year
- Tyrell Johnson, ARST - Defensive Player of the Year
- Chris Bradwell, TROY - Newcomer of the Year
- Giovanni Vizza, UNT – Freshman of the Year
- Howard Schnellenberger, FAU - Coach of the Year
