= 2010 Alabama Vipers season =

Arena Football League team season

- Owner: Doug MacGregor
- Head coach: Dean Cokinos
- Home stadium: Von Braun Center; 700 Monroe Street; Huntsville, AL 35801

Results
- Record: 7–9
- Division place: 4th AC South
- Playoffs: did not qualify

The 2010 Alabama Vipers season was the 10th season for the franchise, and the first under their current name, as well as the first in the Arena Football League. The team was coached by Dean Cokinos and played their home games at Von Braun Center. The Vipers failed to make the playoffs after posting a 7–9 record and finishing 5th in the American Conference.

== Standings ==
South Division
Team	W	L	PCT	PF	PA	DIV	CON	Home	Away
z-Jacksonville Sharks	12	4	.750	893	806	4–2	8–2	7–1	5–3
x-Tampa Bay Storm	11	5	.687	926	812	3–3	8–4	6–2	5–3
x-Orlando Predators	8	8	.500	865	845	4–2	7–3	4–4	4–4
Alabama Vipers	7	9	0.437	812	860	1–5	7–9	5–3	2–6

z - Clinched division and conference's best record
x - Clinched playoff berth

== Regular season schedule ==
The first game for the Vipers was on April 3 on the road against the Battle Wings. Their first home game will be a week later against the Sharks. Their final regular season game was at home in Week 18 against the Blaze on July 31.

Week	Day	Date	Kickoff	Opponent	Results		Location	Report
Week	Day	Date	Kickoff	Opponent	Score	Record	Location	Report
1	Saturday	April 3	8:05 pm	at Bossier–Shreveport Battle Wings	L 48–54	0–1	CenturyTel Center	
2	Friday	April 9	8:30 pm	Jacksonville Sharks	W 63–49	1–1	Von Braun Center	
3	Saturday	April 17	9:05 pm	at Utah Blaze	W 63–54	2–1	E Center	
4	Bye							
5	Saturday	May 1	8:30 pm	Milwaukee Iron	W 75–67	3–1	Von Braun Center	
6	Saturday	May 8	8:00 pm	at Tulsa Talons	L 56–62	3–2	BOK Center	
7	Saturday	May 15	8:30 pm	Orlando Predators	L 31–48	3–3	Von Braun Center	
8	Saturday	May 22	8:30 pm	Bossier–Shreveport Battle Wings	W 56–19	4–3	Von Braun Center	
9	Friday	May 28	8:05 pm	at Oklahoma City Yard Dawgz	L 39–65	4–4	Cox Convention Center	
10	Saturday	June 5	8:05 pm	at Iowa Barnstormers	W 45–44	5–4	Wells Fargo Arena	
11	Saturday	June 12	8:30 pm	Tampa Bay Storm	L 55–61	5–5	Von Braun Center	
12	Saturday	June 19	8:30 pm	Dallas Vigilantes	W 55–52	6–5	Von Braun Center	
13	Bye							
14	Saturday	July 3	7:05 pm	at Jacksonville Sharks	L 47–62	6–6	Jacksonville Veterans Memorial Arena	
15	Saturday	July 10	7:30 pm	at Orlando Predators	L 34–45	6–7	Amway Arena	
16	Saturday	July 17	8:30 pm	Tulsa Talons	L 41–68	6–8	Von Braun Center	
17	Saturday	July 24	7:30 pm	at Tampa Bay Storm	L 29–53	6–9	St. Pete Times Forum	
18	Saturday	July 31	8:30 pm	Utah Blaze	W 68–64	7–9	Von Braun Center	

All times are EDT

== Roster ==
Alabama Vipers roster
Quarterbacks: 11 Kevin Eakin; 14 Tony Colston; 16 Tim Hicks; Fullbacks: 44 Billy Eubanks; Wide receivers: 19 Willie Quinnie; 8 C. J. Johnson KR; 1 Larry Shipp DB; 10 Jeremy Grier DB	Offensive linemen: 55 Lorenzo Breland; -- Germayle Franklin; 77 Joe Holmes; 85 Ray Norell; 68 Troy Reddick; Defensive linemen: 9 Eric Scott; 91 Aaron McConnell; 24 Rico Reese; 42 Steve Fifita LB; -- Rodney Hardeway	Linebackers: 18 Eric Crosby WR; 38 Dan Alexander FB; Defensive backs: 2 Travis Coleman; 6 Vince Hill; -- Desmond Foster; 21 Raeshon Ball; Kickers: 16 Brian Jackson	Injured reserve: -- Travis Blanchard WR/DB; 21 Quentin Burrell DB; 3 Robert Durham DB; 5 Michael Johnson WR; 4 Alonzo Nix WR; 64 Steve Sene OL/DL; Exempt list: Currently vacant; Suspended list: -- Branden Hall OL; -- Andrico Hines QB; Rookies in italics; Roster updated June 11, 2010; 24 Active, 8 Inactive

== Coaching staff ==
- Dean Cokinos – Head coach
- John Kirk – Offensive line coach
- Demetrius Derico – Defensive backs coach

== Regular season ==
=== Week 1: at Bossier–Shreveport Battle Wings ===
Quarter	1	2	3	4	Total
Vipers	7	13	7	21	48
Battle Wings	13	20	0	21	54

at CenturyTel Center, Bossier City, Louisiana

- Date: April 3
- Game time: 8:05 pm EDT
- Game attendance: 2,974
- Referee: Scott Vaughn
- Recap

Game information

1st quarter

- Bossier–Shreveport – Willis Marshall 23-yard pass from Raymond Philyaw (Art Carmody kick no good), 13:38
- Alabama – Dan Alexander 3-yard run (Brian Jackson kick), 7:13
- Bossier–Shreveport – PJ Berry 2-yard run (Art Carmody kick), 1:40

2nd quarter

- Alabama – Dan Alexander 3-yard run (Brian Jackson kick), 12:18
- Bossier–Shreveport – PJ Berry 2-yard pass from Raymond Philyaw (Art Carmody kick), 10:01
- Alabama – Jeremy Grier 7-yard pass from Kevin Eakin (Brian Jackson kick no good), 6:07
- Bossier–Shreveport – James Jordan 3 yd pass from Raymond Philyaw (Art Carmody kick no good), 2:57
- Bossier–Shreveport – PJ Berry 2-yard pass from Raymond Philyaw (Art Carmody kick), 0:06

3rd quarter

- Alabama – Dan Alexander 2-yard run (Brian Jackson kick), 7:34

4th quarter

- Alabama – Dan Alexander 4-yard run (Brian Jackson kick), 14:25
- Bossier–Shreveport – PJ Berry 4-yard pass from Raymond Philyaw (Kinsmon Lancaster pass), 9:16
- Bossier–Shreveport – Manwell Talbert 29-yard pass from Raymond Philyaw (Art Carmody kick), 4:37
- Alabama – CJ Johnson 5-yard pass from Kevin Eakin (Brian Jackson kick), 5:10
- Alabama – Dan Alexander 1-yard run (Brian Jackson kick), 1:56
- Bossier–Shreveport – Willis Marshall 11-yard pass from Raymond Philyaw (Art Carmody kick no good), 0:05

Passing

- Alabama – Kevin Eakin: 22/38, 288 yards, 2 TD
- Bossier–Shreveport – Raymond Philyaw: 28/42, 306 yards, 7 TD

Rushing

- Alabama – Dan Alexander: 10 att, 17 yards, 5 TD
- Bossier–Shreveport – Byron Douzart: 2 att, 7 yards

Receiving

- Alabama – Michael Johnson: 14 rec, 229 yards
- Bossier–Shreveport – James Jordan: 11 rec, 99 yards, 1 TD

The Vipers lost their season opener in a close game. On the game's final play, needing a touchdown to tie, Alabama receiver Michael Johnson caught a pass, faked a lateral, and ran down the sideline. Having been tackled into the walls that border the sideline, he handed the ball to a teammate who ran into the end zone. The officials signaled a touchdown, but after a brief discussion amongst themselves, they overturned the original ruling because a player who is forced into the wall is considered out of bounds. Johnson was ruled down at the 5-yard line, but because there was no time remaining on the clock, the Vipers could not run another play, resulting in a 54–48 loss. Quarterback Kevin Eakin threw for 288 yards, but only 2 touchdowns. Dan Alexander had 5 touchdowns on 10 carries.

=== Week 2: vs. Jacksonville Sharks ===
Quarter	1	2	3	4	Total
Sharks	7	21	7	14	49
Vipers	7	14	14	28	63

at Von Braun Center, Huntsville, Alabama

- Date: April 9
- Game time: 8:30 pm EDT
- Game attendance: 4,007
- Recap

Game information

1st quarter

- Alabama – Dan Alexander 2-yard run (Brian Jackson kick), 11:12
- Jacksonville – Jason Willis 29-yard pass from Aaron Garcia (Paul Edinger kick), 9:19

2nd quarter

- Alabama – Dan Alexander 4-yard run (Brian Jackson kick), 13:19
- Jacksonville – Jason Willis 3-yard pass from Aaron Garcia (Paul Edinger kick), 11:00
- Alabama – Dan Alexander 3-yard run (Brian Jackson kick), 4:57
- Jacksonville – Jomo Wilson 50-yard kickoff return (Paul Edinger kick), 4:43
- Jacksonville – Sale' Key 6-yard pass from Aaron Garcia (Paul Edinger kick), 0:00

3rd quarter

- Jacksonville – Kirby Griffin 2-yard run (Paul Edinger kick), 10:50
- Alabama – CJ Johnson 27-yard pass from Kevin Eakin (Brian Jackson kick), 9:41
- Alabama – CJ Johnson 16-yard pass from Kevin Eakin (Brian Jackson kick), 2:40

4th quarter

- Alabama – Larry Shipp 10-yard pass from Kevin Eakin (Brian Jackson kick), 13:29
- Alabama – Ahmad Hawkins 40-yard interception return (Brian Jackson kick), 12:45
- Alabama – Dan Alexander 7-yard run (Brian Jackson kick), 5:53
- Jacksonville – James Clark 7-yard pass from Aaron Garcia (Paul Edinger kick), 3:43
- Alabama – Larry Shipp 12-yard pass from Kevin Eakin (Brian Jackson kick), 1:26
- Jacksonville – Jomo Wilson 13-yard pass from Aaron Garcia (Paul Edinger kick), 0:49

Passing

- Jacksonville – Aaron Garcia: 18/29, 186 yards, 5 TD, 2 INT
- Alabama – Kevin Eakin: 22/41, 244 yards, 4 TD

Rushing

- Jacksonville – Kirby Griffin: 2 att, 4 yards, 1 TD
- Alabama – Dan Alexander: 13 att, 40 yards, 4 TD

Receiving

- Jacksonville – Jason Willis: 3 rec, 54 yards, 2 TD
- Alabama – CJ Johnson: 6 rec, 96 yards, 2 TD

After giving up the first touchdown on the 2nd half and at that point trailing by 14 points, the Vipers scored the game's next 5 touchdowns to take a 56–35 4th quarter lead. The 21 point cushion held, as the Vipers went on to win 63–49 for the team's first victory of the season. Dan Alexander led the team in rushing again, with 40 yards and 4 touchdowns. Quarterback Kevin Eakin threw for 244 yards and also had 4 touchdowns.

=== Week 3: at Utah Blaze ===
Quarter	1	2	3	4	Total
Vipers	21	14	14	14	63
Blaze	19	13	14	8	54

at E Center, West Valley City, Utah

- Date: April 17
- Game time: 9:05 pm EDT
- Game attendance: 4,898
- Referee: Steve Strimling
- Recap

Game information

1st quarter

- Utah – Brandon Hampton 46-yard interception return (Kenny Byrd kick no good), 13:02
- Alabama – Larry Shipp 14-yard pass from Kevin Eakin (Brian Jackson kick), 9:56
- Utah – Brandon Hampton 55-yard kickoff return (Kenny Byrd kick), 9:03
- Alabama – Larry Shipp 33-yard pass from Kevin Eakin (Brian Jackson kick), 4:45
- Utah – Mickey Pimentel 1-yard run (Kenny Byrd kick no good), 1:09
- Alabama – Larry Shipp 45-yard pass from Kevin Eakin (Brian Jackson kick), 0:00

2nd quarter

- Utah – Chris Francies 8-yard pass from Brett Elliott (Kenny Byrd kick no good), 11:47
- Alabama – Dan Alexander 3-yard run (Brian Jackson kick), 9:09
- Utah – Mickey Pimentel 1-yard run (Kenny Byrd kick), 5:30
- Alabama – Dan Alexander 4-yard run (Brian Jackson kick), 2:17

3rd quarter

- Utah – Aaron Boone 7-yard pass from Brett Elliott (Kenny Byrd kick no good), 9:52
- Alabama – Larry Shipp 43-yard pass from Kevin Eakin (Brian Jackson kick), 8:44
- Alabama – Dan Alexander 1-yard run (Brian Jackson kick), 1:30
- Utah – Wendall Williams 36-yard pass from Brett Elliott (Aaron Boone pass), 0:00

4th quarter

- Alabama – Michael Johnson 20-yard pass from Kevin Eakin (Brian Jackson kick), 12:19
- Alabama – Dan Alexander 6-yard run (Brian Jackson kick), 0:51
- Utah – Aaron Boone 13-yard pass from Brett Elliott (Aaron Boone pass), 0:40

Passing

- Alabama – Kevin Eakin: 21/31, 375 yards, 5 TD, 1 INT
- Utah – Brett Elliott: 21/38, 231 yards, 4 TD, 1 INT

Rushing

- Alabama – Dan Alexander: 13 att, 45 yards, 4 TD
- Utah – Mickey Pimentel: 5 att, 5 yards, 2 TD

Receiving

- Alabama – Larry Shipp: 8 rec, 199 yards, 4 TD
- Utah – Wendall Williams: 7 rec, 90 yards, 1 TD

The game featured many lead changes and both teams matched touchdown for touchdown almost all night, but it was the Vipers who came out with the win, improving to 2–1 on the season. Leading by only 3 points at the start of the 4th quarter, Alabama's defense kept the Blaze out of the end zone until the game was all but over, while the offense was able to build a 17-point lead. Kevin Eakin threw for 375 yards and 5 touchdowns, and Larry Shipp led all receivers with 199 yards and 4 touchdowns. Dan Alexander rushed for 4 touchdowns in the win.

=== Week 5: vs. Milwaukee Iron ===
Quarter	1	2	3	4	Total
Iron	7	33	13	14	67
Vipers	7	28	19	21	75

at Von Braun Center, Huntsville, Alabama

- Date: May 1
- Game time: 8:30 pm EDT
- Game attendance: 5,070
- Recap

Game information

1st quarter

- Alabama – C.J. Johnson 4-yard pass from Kevin Eakin (Brian Jackson kick), 9:42
- Milwaukee – Nate Forse 7-yard pass from Chris Greisen (Chris Greisen kick), 3:56

2nd quarter

- Milwaukee – Nate Forse 7-yard pass from Chris Greisen (Robert Forstrom kick), 12:13
- Alabama – Larry Shipp 13-yard pass from Kevin Eakin (Brian Jackson kick), 9:58
- Milwaukee – Carlton Brown 50-yard kickoff return (Robert Forstrom kick), 9:10
- Alabama – Michael Johnson 33-yard pass from Kevin Eakin (Brian Jackson kick), 8:13
- Milwaukee – Damian Harrell 23-yard pass from Chris Greisen (Robert Forstrom kick), 6:43
- Alabama – Jeremy Grier 14-yard pass from Kevin Eakin (Brian Jackson kick) 4:55
- Milwaukee – Damian Harrell 13-yard pass from Chris Greisen (Robert Forstrom kick no good), 0:43
- Alabama – C.J. Johnson 20-yard pass from Kevin Eakin (Brian Jackson kick), 0:18
- Milwaukee – Anthony Jones 7-yard pass from Chris Greisen (Robert Forstrom kick blocked), 0:02

3rd quarter

- Alabama – Dan Alexander 7-yard run (Brian Jackson kick), 13:44
- Milwaukee – Nate Forse 14-yard pass from Chris Greisen (Robert Forstrom kick), 11:54
- Alabama – Dan Alexander 2-yard run (Brian Jackson kick), 7:57
- Milwaukee – Damian Harrell 9-yard pass from Chris Greisen (Robert Forstrom kick blocked), 6:47
- Alabama – Brian Jackson 8-yard field goal, 2:51

4th quarter

- Alabama – C.J. Johnson 11-yard pass from Kevin Eakin (Brian Jackson kick), 13:20
- Alabama – Larry Shipp 20-yard pass from Kevin Eakin (Brian Jackson kick), 5:45
- Milwaukee – Anthony Jones 8-yard pass from Chris Greisen (Robert Forstrom kick), 3:23
- Alabama – Larry Shipp 48-yard run (Brian Jackson kick), 1:14
- Milwaukee – Nate Forse 14-yard pass from Chris Greisen (Robert Forstrom kick), 0:39

Passing

- Milwaukee – Chris Greisen: 33/46, 360 yards, 9 TD
- Alabama – Kevin Eakin: 19/26, 221 yards, 7 TD

Rushing

- Milwaukee – Anthony Jones: 1 att, 4 yards
- Alabama – Larry Shipp: 2 att, 68 yards, 1 TD

Receiving

- Milwaukee – Nate Forse: 15 rec, 207 yards, 4 TD
- Alabama – C.J. Johnson: 7 rec, 91 yards, 3 TD

The Vipers won their third straight game and handed the Iron their first loss of the season with a 75–67 win. It was back and forth all night, with Milwaukee leading at the half with a 7-yard passing touchdown with a few seconds left in a high scoring 2nd quarter. In the 3rd quarter, the Vipers took a 54–53 lead on a Brian Jackson field goal from 8 yards out. Their lead would carry into the 4th quarter, when Alabama took control of the game with a pair of touchdown passes by Kevin Eakin. Larry Shipp had a 48-yard rushing touchdown with just over a minute left. The Iron scored a touchdown with 39 seconds remaining to cut Alabama's lead to 8 points, but the Vipers recovered the ensuing onside kick and ran the clock out for the win. Eakin finished with 221 yards and 7 touchdowns. C.J. Johnson was the leading receiver with 91 yards and 3 touchdowns.

=== Week 6: at Tulsa Talons ===
Quarter	1	2	3	4	Total
Vipers	14	14	14	14	56
Talons	6	7	29	20	62

at BOK Center, Tulsa, Oklahoma

- Date: May 8
- Game time: 8:00 pm EDT
- Referee: Joe Pester
- Recap

Game information

1st quarter

- Alabama – Michael Johnson 40-yard pass from Kevin Eakin (Liam Coen kick), 12:04
- Alabama – Dan Alexander 1-yard run (Liam Coen kick), 10:28
- Tulsa – Odie Armstrong 1-yard run (Tony Dodson kick no good), 6:29

2nd quarter

- Alabama – C.J. Johnson 6-yard pass from Kevin Eakin (Liam Coen kick), 7:29
- Tulsa – Jeff Hughley 4-yard pass from Justin Allgood (Tony Dodson kick), 4:42
- Alabama – Larry Shipp 7-yard pass from Kevin Eakin (Liam Coen kick), 0:25

3rd quarter

- Tulsa – Carlese Franklin 7-yard pass from Justin Allgood (Jamar Ransom pass), 11:29
- Alabama – Dan Alexander 1-yard run (Liam Coen kick), 9:35
- Tulsa – Donovan Morgan 8-yard pass from Justin Allgood (Tony Dodson kick no good), 8:33
- Tulsa – Odie Armstrong 7-yard pass from Justin Allgood (Donovan Morgan pass), 4:01
- Alabama – Dan Alexander 1-yard run (Liam Coen kick), 0:56
- Tulsa – Donovan Morgan 24-yard pass from Justin Allgood (Tony Dodson kick), 0:00

4th quarter

- Tulsa – Safety, 14:12
- Tulsa – Odie Armstrong 37-yard run (Tony Dodson kick blocked), 12:18
- Tulsa – Donovan Morgan 4-yard pass from Justin Allgood (Tony Dodson kick no good), 5:18
- Alabama – Larry Shipp 22-yard pass from Tony Colston (Liam Coen kick), 0:58
- Tulsa – Donovan Morgan 7-yard pass from Justin Allgood (Tony Dodson kick no good), 0:40
- Alabama – Tony Colston 10-yard run (Liam Coen kick), 0:28

Passing

- Alabama – Kevin Eakin: 23/32, 281 yards, 3 TD
- Tulsa – Justin Allgood: 23/31, 244 yards, 7 TD, 1 INT

Rushing

- Alabama – Dan Alexander: 11 att, 8 yards, 3 TD
- Tulsa – Odie Armstrong: 4 att, 41 yards, 2 TD

Receiving

- Alabama – Michael Johnson: 8 rec, 120 yards, 1 TD
- Tulsa – Carlese Franklin: 10 rec, 110 yards, 1 TD

The Vipers' 3-game winning streak was snapped after coming up short against the Talons. Alabama led at halftime 28–13, but by the end of the 3rd quarter, the game was tied 42–42. The Vipers did not score in the 4th quarter until there was less than a minute remaining. By that time, they had allowed two Tulsa touchdowns and a safety to fall behind 56–42 before Larry Shipp's 22-yard touchdown reception. Tulsa found the end zone again on their ensuing drive to make it a 14-point game again. Backup quarterback Tony Colston answered by running for a touchdown from 10 yards out. Now only down 62–56, the Vipers attempted an onside kick but did not recover it. The Talons took possession and ran out the clock for the win.

Starting quarterback Kevin Eakin threw for 281 yards and 3 touchdowns, but had to leave the game in the 4th quarter after suffering a sprained right ankle. Eakin had a similar injury in ArenaCup IX. Shipp's and Michael Johnson's receiving stats were almost identical. Shipp caught 8 passes for 119 yards and 2 touchdowns, while Johnson caught 8 passes for 120 yards and just a single touchdown.

=== Week 7: vs. Orlando Predators ===
Quarter	1	2	3	4	Total
Predators	3	7	14	24	48
Vipers	3	21	0	7	31

at Von Braun Center, Huntsville, Alabama

- Date: May 15
- Game time: 8:30 pm EDT
- Game attendance: 4,007
- Recap

Game information

1st quarter

- Alabama – Brian Jackson 15-yard field goal, 10:23
- Orlando – Carlos Martinez 22-yard field goal, 5:36

2nd quarter

- Alabama – Dan Alexander 2-yard run (Brian Jackson kick), 9:14
- Orlando – T.T. Toliver 5-yard pass from Nick Hill (Carlos Martinez kick), 5:43
- Alabama – Willie Quinne 39-yard pass from Stephen Wasil (Brian Jackson kick), 3:17
- Alabama – Willie Quinne 42-yard pass from Stephen Wasil (Brian Jackson kick), 0:00

3rd quarter

- Orlando – Derrick Lewis 15-yard pass from Nick Hill (Carlos Martinez kick), 11:28
- Orlando – Jerrian James 5-yard pass from Nick Hill (Carlos Martinez kick), 2:15

4th quarter

- Alabama – Stephen Wasil 4-yard run (Brian Jackson kick), 12:13
- Orlando – James Lynch 1-yard run (Carlos Martinez kick), 8:41
- Orlando – T.T. Toliver 9-yard pass from Nick Hill (Carlos Martinez kick), 3:52
- Orlando – Carlos Martinez 8-yard field goal, 0:13
- Orlando – Robert Quiroga 1-yard fumble return (Carlos Martinez kick), 0:09

Passing

- Orlando – Nick Hill: 34/51, 273 yards, 4 TD
- Alabama – Stephen Wasil: 14/27, 200 yards, 2 TD, 2 INT

Rushing

- Orlando – Nick Hill: 4 att, 29 yards
- Alabama – Stephen Wasil: 4 att, 17 yards, 1 TD

Receiving

- Orlando – Derrick Lewis: 14 rec, 97 yards, 1 TD
- Alabama – Willie Quinne: 3 rec, 86 yards, 2 TD

=== Week 8: vs. Bossier–Shreveport Battle Wings ===
Quarter	1	2	3	4	Total
Battle Wings	13	0	6	0	19
Vipers	14	21	7	14	56

at Von Braun Center, Huntsville, Alabama

- Date: May 22
- Game time: 8:30 pm EDT
- Game attendance: 3,701
- Recap

Game information

1st quarter

- Alabama – Larry Shipp 9-yard run (Brian Jackson kick), 11:50
- Bossier–Shreveport – Christian Wise 14-yard pass from Randy Hymes (Nick Gatto kick no good), 7:25
- Bossier–Shreveport – Byron Douzart 18-yard pass from Randy Hymes (Nick Gatto kick), 6:55
- Alabama – C.J. Johnson 17-yard pass from Tony Colston (Brian Jackson kick), 2:31

2nd quarter

- Alabama – Dan Alexander 2-yard run (Brian Jackson kick), 13:19
- Alabama – Willie Quinne 3-yard pass from Tony Colston (Brian Jackson kick)
- Alabama – Tony Colston 2-yard run (Brian Jackson kick), 0:12

3rd quarter

- Alabama – C.J. Johnson 33-yard pass from Tony Colston (Brian Jackson kick), 5:41
- Bossier–Shreveport – Willis Marshall 34-yard pass from Randy Hymes (Nick Gatto kick no good), 6:55

4th quarter

- Alabama – Willie Quinne 20-yard pass from Tony Colston (Brian Jackson kick), 13:21
- Alabama – Willie Quinne 5-yard pass from Tony Colston (Brian Jackson kick), 2:08

Passing

- Bossier–Shreveport – Randy Hymes: 20/39, 221 yards, 3 TD, 3 INT
- Alabama – Tony Colston: 17/25, 238 yards, 5 TD

Rushing

- Bossier–Shreveport – Randy Hymes: 4 att, 28 yards
- Alabama – Tony Colston: 4 att, 35 yards, 1 TD

Receiving

- Bossier–Shreveport – Willis Marshall: 11 rec, 131 yards, 1 TD
- Alabama – C.J. Johnson: 6 rec, 118 yards, 2 TD

=== Week 9: at Oklahoma City Yard Dawgz ===
Quarter	1	2	3	4	Total
Vipers	13	7	13	6	39
Yard Dawgz	16	16	13	20	65

at Cox Convention Center, Oklahoma City, Oklahoma

- Date: May 28
- Game time: 8:05 pm EDT
- Game attendance: 5,139
- Referee: Chris Sneed
- Recap

Game information

1st quarter

- Oklahoma City – Safety, 12:37
- Oklahoma City – Anthony Hines 17-yard pass from Tommy Grady (A.J. Haglund kick), 9:37
- Alabama – C.J. Johnson 55-yard kickoff return (Steve Azar kick), 9:37
- Oklahoma City – Al Hunt 2-yard run (A.J. Haglund kick), 5:22
- Alabama – C.J. Johnson 6-yard pass from Kevin Eakin (Steve Azar kick no good), 1:01

2nd quarter

- Alabama – Dan Alexander 6-yard run (Steve Azar kick), 13:12
- Oklahoma City – Timon Marshall 26-yard pass from Tommy Grady (David Hyland pass no good), 9:56
- Oklahoma City – A.J. Haglund 27-yard field goal, 1:00
- Oklahoma City – Chad Cook 3-yard run (A.J. Haglund kick), 0:02

3rd quarter

- Oklahoma City – David Hyland 0-yard kickoff return (A.J. Haglund kick), 14:30
- Alabama – Eric Scott 38-yard field goal return (Steve Azar kick no good), 9:13
- Oklahoma City – Al Hunt 3-yard run (A.J. Haglund kick no good), 4:19
- Alabama – Larry Shipp 43-yard pass from Kevin Eakin (Steve Azar kick), 2:19

4th quarter

- Oklahoma City – Anthony Hines 24-yard pass from Tommy Grady (A.J. Haglund pass no good), 14:06
- Oklahoma City – Collin Taylor 15-yard interception return (Tommy Grady pass no good), 12:15
- Oklahoma City – Kevin Myers 12-yard pass from Tommy Grady (Xavier Lee pass), 3:49
- Alabama – Tony Colston 3-yard run (Steve Azar kick no good), 1:31

Passing

- Alabama – Kevin Eakin: 10/19, 163 yards, 2 TD, 3 INT
- Oklahoma City – Tommy Grady: 24/38, 265 yards, 4 TD, 1 INT

Rushing

- Alabama – Tony Colston: 2 att, 10 yards, 1 TD
- Oklahoma City – Al Hunt: 2 att, 5 yards, 2 TD

Receiving

- Alabama – Larry Shipp: 7 rec, 148 yards, 1 TD
- Oklahoma City – Anthony Hines: 6 rec, 77 yards, 2 TD

=== Week 10: at Iowa Barnstormers ===
Quarter	1	2	3	4	Total
Vipers	14	12	0	19	45
Barnstormers	7	21	13	3	44

at Wells Fargo Arena, Des Moines, Iowa

- Date: June 5
- Game time: 8:05 pm EDT
- Game attendance: 8,143
- Referee: Brad Van Vark
- Recap

Game information

1st quarter

- Alabama – Jeremy Grier 19-yard pass from Kevin Eakin (Greg Gundersen kick), 9:13
- Iowa – Tommy Ellingworth 12-yard pass from Ryan Vena (Jeff Glas kick), 4:54
- Alabama – Dan Alexander 1-yard run (Greg Gundersen kick), 0:11

2nd quarter

- Iowa – Jesse Schmidt 33-yard pass from Ryan Vena (Jeff Glas kick), 13:59
- Alabama – Jeremy Grier 17-yard pass from Kevin Eakin (Greg Gundersen kick no good), 12:03
- Iowa – Ryan Vena 6-yard run (Jeff Glas kick), 5:56
- Iowa – Tommy Ellingworth 35-yard pass from Ryan Vena (Jeff Glas kick), 0:49
- Alabama – Larry Shipp 5-yard pass from Kevin Eakin (Greg Gundersen kick no good), 0:14

3rd quarter

- Iowa – Todd Blythe 18-yard pass from Ryan Vena (Jeff Glas kick no good), 11:23
- Iowa – Tommy Ellingworth 15-yard pass from Ryan Vena (Jeff Glas kick), 5:09

4th quarter

- Alabama – Larry Shipp 4-yard pass from Kevin Eakin (Kevin Eakin pass no good), 14:29
- Alabama – Larry Shipp 10-yard pass from Kevin Eakin (Greg Gundersen kick), 5:11
- Iowa – Jeff Glas 18-yard field goal, 1:35
- Alabama – Alonzo Nix 14-yard pass from Kevin Eakin (Kevin Eakin pass no good), 0:05

Passing

- Alabama – Kevin Eakin: 34/50, 386 yards, 6 TD, 2 INT
- Iowa – Ryan Vena: 15/33, 222 yards, 5 TD, 2 INT

Rushing

- Alabama – Kevin Eakin: 2 att, 13 yards
- Iowa – Rodney Filer: 2 att, 15 yards

Receiving

- Alabama – Jeremy Grier: 12 rec, 138 yards, 2 TD
- Iowa – Tommy Ellingworth: 5 rec, 88 yards, 3 TD

=== Week 11: vs. Tampa Bay Storm ===
Quarter	1	2	3	4	Total
Storm	13	28	10	10	61
Vipers	7	13	14	21	55

at Von Braun Center, Huntsville, Alabama

- Date: June 12
- Game time: 9:30 pm EDT
- Game attendance: 5,994
- Recap

Game information

1st quarter

- Tampa Bay – Hank Edwards 11-yard pass from Brett Dietz (Garrett Rivas kick blocked), 9:17
- Tampa Bay – DeAndrew Rubin 23-yard pass from Brett Dietz (Garrett Rivas kick), 5:11
- Alabama – C.J. Johnson 6-yard pass from Kevin Eakin (Brian Jackson kick), 1:09

2nd quarter

- Tampa Bay – DeAndrew Rubin 6-yard pass from Brett Dietz (Garrett Rivas kick), 14:16
- Alabama – Dan Alexander 1-yard run (Brian Jackson kick), 8:57
- Tampa Bay – Sedrick Robinson 30-yard pass from Brett Dietz (Garrett Rivas kick), 4:02
- Tampa Bay – Michael Hawthorne 10-yard interception return (Garrett Rivas kick), 1:20
- Alabama – Larry Shipp 17-yard pass from Kevin Eakin (Brian Jackson kick blocked), 0:38
- Tampa Bay – Thomas Kaleita 8-yard pass from Brett Dietz (Garrett Rivas kick), 0:06

3rd quarter

- Tampa Bay – Garrett Rivas 13-yard field goal, 9:59
- Alabama – Larry Shipp 23-yard pass from Kevin Eakin (Brian Jackson kick), 6:07
- Tampa Bay – James Bear 5-yard run (Garrett Rivas kick), 4:58
- Alabama – Larry Shipp 22-yard pass from Kevin Eakin (Brian Jackson kick), 2:45

4th quarter

- Tampa Bay – Garrett Rivas 15-yard field goal, 10:24
- Alabama – C.J. Johnson 34-yard pass from Kevin Eakin (Brian Jackson kick), 8:12
- Tampa Bay – Hank Edwards 11-yard pass from Brett Dietz (Garrett Rivas kick), 5:09
- Alabama – Jeremy Grier 9-yard pass from Kevin Eakin (Brian Jackson kick), 1:09
- Alabama – Larry Shipp 38-yard pass from Kevin Eakin (Brian Jackson kick), 0:25

Passing

- Tampa Bay – Brett Dietz: 20/36, 258 yards, 6 TD
- Alabama – Kevin Eakin: 32/44, 396 yards, 7 TD, 2 INT

Rushing

- Tampa Bay – James Bear: 2 att, 5 yards, 1 TD
- Alabama – Kevin Eakin: 1 att, 5 yards

Receiving

- Tampa Bay – Hank Edwards: 6 rec, 112 yards, 2 TD
- Alabama – Larry Shipp: 14 rec, 208 yards, 4 TD

=== Week 12: vs. Dallas Vigilantes ===
Quarter	1	2	3	4	Total
Vigilantes	14	17	7	14	52
Vipers	20	13	7	15	55

at Von Braun Center, Huntsville, Alabama

- Date: June 19
- Game time: 8:30 pm EDT
- Game attendance: 5,260
- Recap

Game information

1st quarter

- Alabama – Larry Shipp 14-yard pass from Kevin Eakin (Brian Jackson kick), 12:09
- Dallas – Kenny Henderson 12-yard pass from Collin Drafts (Mark Lewis kick), 6:25
- Alabama – Michael Johnson 35-yard pass from Kevin Eakin (Brian Jackson kick), 3:20
- Dallas – Kenny Henderson 26-yard pass from Collin Drafts (Mark Lewis kick), 1:00
- Alabama – C.J. Johnson 56-yard kickoff return (Brian Jackson kick no good), 0:05

2nd quarter

- Dallas – Duke Pettijohn 1-yard run (Mark Lewis kick), 13:29
- Alabama – Larry Shipp 18-yard pass from Kevin Eakin (Brian Jackson kick), 8:23
- Dallas – Mark Lewis 18-yard field goal, 5:42
- Alabama – Michael Johnson 27-yard pass from Kevin Eakin (Brian Jackson kick no good), 2:27
- Dallas – Larry Brackins 7-yard pass from B.J. Hall (Mark Lewis kick), 0:22

3rd quarter

- Alabama – C.J. Johnson 3-yard pass from Kevin Eakin (Brian Jackson kick), 12:39
- Dallas – B.J. Hall 5-yard run (Mark Lewis kick), 4:57

4th quarter

- Dallas – Kenny Henderson 20-yard pass from B.J. Hall (Mark Lewis kick), 13:53
- Alabama – Larry Shipp 14-yard pass from Kevin Eakin (Michael Johnson pass), 9:49

Passing

- Dallas – B.J. Hall: 16/31, 155 yards, 3 TD
- Alabama – Kevin Eakin: 21/31, 264 yards, 7 TD, 1 INT

Rushing

- Dallas – B.J. Hall: 3 att, 42 yards, 1 TD
- Alabama – Kevin Eakin: 1 att, 5 yards

Receiving

- Dallas – Kenny Henderson: 9 rec, 110 yards, 3 TD
- Alabama – Michael Johnson: 7 rec, 117 yards, 3 TD

=== Week 14: at Jacksonville Sharks ===
Quarter	1	2	3	4	Total
Vipers	6	21	0	20	47
Sharks	6	28	7	21	62

at Jacksonville Veterans Memorial Arena, Jacksonville, Florida

- Date: July 3
- Game time: 7:05 pm EDT
- Recap

Game information

1st quarter

- Jacksonville – Jason Willis 4-yard pass from Aaron Garcia (Paul Edinger kick no good), 9:06
- Alabama – Kevin Eakin 5-yard run (Steve Azar kick no good)

2nd quarter

- Jacksonville – Jason Willis 6-yard pass from Aaron Garcia (Paul Edinger kick), 12:17
- Alabama – Michael Johnson 24-yard pass from Tony Colston (Steve Azar kick), 7:44
- Jacksonville – Bernard Morris 2-yard run (Paul Edinger kick), 5:31
- Alabama – C.J. Johnson 37-yard pass from Tony Colston (Steve Azar kick), 4:15
- Jacksonville – 9-yard kickoff return, 3:05
- Alabama – C.J. Johnson 18-yard pass from Tony Colston (Steve Azar kick), 1:06
- Jacksonville – Bernard Morris 1-yard run (Paul Edinger kick), 0:18

3rd quarter

- Jacksonville – Sale' Key 32-yard pass from Aaron Garcia (Paul Edinger kick), 0:40

4th quarter

- Jacksonville – Will Alford 20-yard fumble return (Paul Edinger kick), 12:28
- Alabama – C.J. Johnson 10-yard pass from Tony Colston (Paul Edinger kick no good), 8:22
- Jacksonville – Kirby Griffin 2-yard run (Paul Edinger kick), 5:01
- Alabama – Larry Shipp 7-yard pass from Tony Colston (Steve Azar kick)
- Jacksonville – Sale' Key 1-yard run (Paul Edinger kick)
- Alabama – C.J. Johnson 5-yard run (Steve Azar kick), 2:11

Passing

- Alabama – Tony Colston: 22/37, 288 yards, 5 TD
- Jacksonville – Aaron Garcia: 19/35, 247 yards, 3 TD

Rushing

- Alabama – Kevin Eakin and C.J. Johnson: 1 att, 5 yards, 1 TD
- Jacksonville – Kirby Griffin: 2 att, 6 yards, 1 TD

Receiving

- Alabama – C.J. Johnson: 10 rec, 113 yards, 3 TD
- Jacksonville – Sale' Key: 7 rec, 110 yards, 1 TD

=== Week 15: at Orlando Predators ===
Quarter	1	2	3	4	Total
Vipers	14	0	6	14	34
Predators	21	10	7	7	45

at Amway Arena, Orlando, Florida

- Date: July 9
- Game time: 8:00 pm EDT
- Game attendance: 10,504
- Referee: Greg Lefils
- Recap

Game information
- Alabama – C.J. Johnson 22-yard pass from Tim Hicks (Brian Jackson kick)
- Orlando – Robert Quiroga 13-yard pass from Nick Hill (Carlos Martinez kick), 10:24
- Orlando – Bobby Sippio 12-yard pass from Nick Hill (Carlos Martinez kick), 7:24
- Alabama – Dan Alexander 1-yard run (Brian Jackson kick), 2:07
- Orlando – T.T. Toliver 18-yard pass from Nick Hill (Carlos Martinez kick), 1:12

2nd quarter

- Orlando – Josh Bush 58-yard field goal return (Carlos Martinez kick), 12:42
- Orlando – Carlos Martinez 24-yard field goal, 0:33

3rd quarter

- Alabama – Michael Johnson 7-yard pass from Tim Hicks (Brian Jackson kick no good), 5:27
- Orlando – Robert Quiroga 19-yard pass from Nick Hill (Carlos Martinez kick), 1:05

4th quarter

- Alabama – Eric Crosby 23-yard interception return (Brian Jackson kick), 12:26
- Orlando – Bobby Sippio 28-yard pass from Nick Hill (Carlos Martinez kick), 8:58
- Alabama – Brandon Hall 2-yard pass from Tim Hicks (Brian Jackson kick), 6:05

Passing

- Alabama – Tim Hicks: 27/44, 267 yards, 3 TD, 3 INT
- Orlando – Nick Hill: 19/28, 206 yards, 5 TD, 1 INT

Rushing

- Alabama – Tim Hicks: 3 att, 11 yards
- Orlando – Nick Hill: 3 att, 42 yards

Receiving

- Alabama – C.J. Johnson: 18 rec, 205 yards, 1 TD
- Orlando – Robert Quiroga: 7 rec, 79 yards, 2 TD

=== Week 16: vs. Tulsa Talons ===
Quarter	1	2	3	4	Total
Talons	0	28	21	12	61
Vipers	14	14	7	13	48

at Von Braun Center, Huntsville, Alabama

- Date: July 17
- Game time: 8:30 pm EDT
- Game attendance: 4,298
- Recap

Game information

1st quarter

- Alabama – Michael Johnson 17-yard pass from Tim Hicks (Brian Jackson kick), 11:53
- Alabama – Vince Hill 46-yard interception return (Brian Jackson kick), 9:14

2nd quarter

- Alabama – Larry Shipp 14-yard pass from Tim Hicks (Brian Jackson kick), 12:48
- Tulsa – Donovan Morgan 6-yard pass from Justin Allgood (Greg Gundersen kick blocked), 10:48
- Tulsa – Odie Armstrong 1-yard run (Greg Gundersen kick), 5:18
- Tulsa – Jeff Hughley 27-yard pass from Justin Allgood (Jeff Hughley run), 0:49
- Alabama – Tim Hicks 5-yard run (Brian Jackson kick), 0:21
- Tulsa – Roderick Green 35-yard pass from Justin Allgood (Greg Gundersen kick), 0:10

3rd quarter

- Tulsa – Roderick Green 1-yard run (Greg Gundersen kick), 13:21
- Tulsa – Odie Armstrong 1-yard pass from Justin Allgood (Greg Gundersen kick), 7:58
- Tulsa – Roderick Green 32-yard pass from Justin Allgood (Greg Gundersen kick), 2:56
- Alabama – Willie Quinne 39-yard pass from Tony Colston (Brian Jackson kick), 0:00

4th quarter

- Tulsa – Greg Gundersen 12-yard field goal, 11:12
- Tulsa – Jeff Hughley 34-yard pass from Justin Allgood (Greg Gundersen kick blocked), 6:19
- Alabama – Michael Johnson 22-yard pass from Tony Colston (Brian Jackson kick)
- Tulsa – Greg Gundersen 14-yard field goal, 0:49
- Alabama – Larry Shipp 31-yard pass from Tony Colston (Lorenzo Breland pass no good), 0:42

Passing

- Tulsa – Justin Allgood: 25/40, 310 yards, 6 TD, 1 INT
- Alabama – Tony Colston: 12/19, 307 yards, 3 TD

Rushing

- Tulsa – Odie Armstrong: 8 att, 42 yards, 1 TD
- Alabama – Larry Shipp: 3 att, 18 yards

Receiving

- Tulsa – Roderick Green: 9 rec, 152 yards, 2 TD
- Alabama – Larry Shipp: 9 rec, 105 yards, 2 TD

=== Week 17: at Tampa Bay Storm ===
Quarter	1	2	3	4	Total
Vipers	10	0	6	13	29
Storm	0	26	21	6	53

at St. Pete Times Forum, Tampa, Florida

- Date: July 24
- Game time: 7:30 pm EDT
- Game attendance: 15,685
- Referee: Tom Symonette
- Recap

Game information

1st quarter

- Alabama – Brian Jackson 27-yard field goal, 6:48
- Alabama – Dan Alexander 33-yard pass from Michael Johnson (Brian Jackson kick), 0:15

2nd quarter

- Tampa Bay – Eric Ortiz 1-yard run (Garrett Rivas kick), 11:07
- Tampa Bay – Eric Ortiz 4-yard run (Garrett Rivas kick), 8:48
- Tampa Bay – Safety, 8:01
- Tampa Bay – Terrence Royal 1-yard run (Garrett Rivas kick), 2:39
- Tampa Bay – Garrett Rivas 13-yard field goal, 0:00

3rd quarter

- Tampa Bay – Hank Edwards 8-yard pass from Brett Dietz (Garrett Rivas kick), 10:30
- Alabama – Dan Alexander 32-yard run (Brian Jackson kick no good), 6:55
- Tampa Bay – Tyrone Timmons 13-yard pass from Brett Dietz (Garrett Rivas kick), 4:25
- Tampa Bay – Michael Hawthorne 0-yard fumble return (Garrett Rivas kick), 3:02

4th quarter

- Tampa Bay – Tyrone Timmons 14-yard pass from Brett Dietz (Garrett Rivas kick no good), 14:18
- Alabama – Dan Alexander 8-yard run (Brian Jackson kick no good), 7:22
- Alabama – C.J. Johnson 11-yard pass from Jeffrey Mroz (Brian Jackson kick), 2:01

Passing

- Alabama – Jeffrey Mroz: 6/12, 44 yards, 1 TD
- Tampa Bay – Brett Dietz: 19/31, 240 yards, 3 TD

Rushing

- Alabama – Dan Alexander: 7 att, 74 yards, 2 TD
- Tampa Bay – Eric Ortiz: 6 att, 7 yards, 2 TD

Receiving

- Alabama – Dan Alexander: 1 rec, 33 yards, 1 TD
- Tampa Bay – Hank Edwards: 7 rec, 88 yards, 1 TD

=== Week 18: vs. Utah Blaze ===
Quarter	1	2	3	4	Total
Blaze	14	14	13	23	64
Vipers	21	21	14	12	68

at Von Braun Center, Huntsville, Alabama

- Date: July 31
- Game time: 8:30 pm EDT
- Game attendance: 5,136
- Recap

Game information

1st quarter

- Alabama – Willie Quinne 1-yard pass from Clint Stoerner (Brian Jackson kick), 9:28
- Utah – Damian Walker 8-yard pass from Mark Thorson (Ben Scott kick), 6:29
- Alabama – C.J. Johnson 56-yard kickoff return (Brian Jackson kick), 5:05
- Alabama – Vince Hill 3-yard fumble return (Brian Jackson kick), 3:39
- Utah – Aaron LeSue 45-yard pass from Mark Thorson (Ben Scott kick), 1:42

2nd quarter

- Alabama – C.J. Johnson 20-yard pass from Clint Stoerner (Brian Jackson kick), 13:34
- Alabama – Willie Quinne 6-yard pass from Clint Stoerner (Brian Jackson kick), 9:46
- Utah – Aaron LeSue 3-yard run (Ben Scott kick), 5:23
- Utah – Aaron Boone 3-yard pass from Brett Elliott (Ben Scott kick), 1:54
- Alabama – C.J. Johnson 10-yard pass from Clint Stoerner (Brian Jackson kick), 1:14

3rd quarter

- Alabama – Aaron Boone 5-yard pass from Brett Elliott (Ben Scott kick), 13:07
- Utah – C.J. Johnson 15-yard pass from Clint Stoerner (Brian Jackson kick), 10:23
- Alabama – Vince Hill 29-yard interception return (Brian Jackson kick), 8:16
- Alabama – Brett Elliott 1-yard run (Ben Scott kick no good), 3:39

4th quarter

- Utah – Aaron LeSue 4-yard pass from Brett Elliott (Ben Scott kick), 12:26
- Utah – Jason Boone 35-yard pass from Brett Elliott (Jason Boone pass no good), 7:23
- Utah – Aaron LeSue 12-yard pass from Brett Elliott (Ben Scott kick), 4:57
- Alabama – Willie Quinne 13-yard pass from Clint Stoerner (Clint Stoerner pass no good), 1:00
- Utah – Ben Scott 12-yard field goal, 0:39
- Alabama – Jeremy Grier 27-yard pass from Clint Stoerner (Clint Stoerner run no good), 0:27

Passing

- Utah – Brett Elliott: 21/30, 205 yards, 5 TD, 3 INT
- Alabama – Clint Stoerner: 21/30, 210 yards, 7 TD, 1 INT

Rushing

- Utah – Aaron LeSue: 2 att, 9 yards, 1 TD
- Alabama – Dan Alexander: 5 att, 12 yards

Receiving

- Utah – Aaron LeSue: 7 rec, 121 yards, 3 TD
- Alabama – C.J. Johnson: 11 rec, 114 yards, 3 TD
