= Clairemont High School =

Public high school in San Diego, California, United States

Location
- 4150 Ute Drive; San Diego, California, 92117; United States; 32°48′33″N 117°12′11″W

Information
- Type: Public
- Established: 1958
- School district: San Diego Unified School District
- Principal: Karly Johnstone
- Teaching staff: 42.75 (FTE)
- Grades: 9-12
- Enrollment: 813 (2023-2024)
- Student to teacher ratio: 19.02
- Colors: Orange; Blue; White
- Mascot: Chieftains (1958-2026) Captains (2026-present)
- Yearbook: The Calumet
- Website: Clairemont High School

Clairemont High School is a public high school serving grades 9-12. It is located in the community of Clairemont in San Diego, California, United States. It is part of San Diego Unified School District. The campus is situated close to the intersection of Balboa Avenue and Clairemont Drive. It is accredited by the Western Association of Schools and Colleges.

== History ==
The school is named after the Clairemont community in which it is located.

When Clairemont opened its doors in 1958, it consisted of no senior class, a junior class (class of 1960) consisting mostly of transfers from Mission Bay High School in nearby Pacific Beach and Kearny High School, and a sophomore class (class of 1961) coming from its neighbor, Marston Junior High. There was no freshman class.

Ritchie Valens, who at the time had two hits on the charts, "La Bamba" and "Donna," played at Clairemont High School's opening.

On December 18, 1970, Mason Williams ('Classical Gas') performed benefit concerts for the Pala Indian Reservation Cultural Center hosted by Clairemont High School. Organized by the ASB, Mr. Wallazz 'Wally' Eaton (ASB advisor) and sponsored by the nonprofit 'Americans for Indian Future and Tradition,' Williams performed two shows—one during the day for the students and an evening show for the general public. The event was a success and raised $1400—enough funds at that time to pay for the block walls. Local TV news and the Sentinel newspaper were on campus to report the award of the donation to elders of the tribe by the ASB president on behalf of CHS and AIFT. Today, the Cupa Cultural Center remains an integral part of the Pala Indian Reservation in northern San Diego County. A plaque at the Center lists Clairemont High School as a contributor.

In April 2025, the San Diego Unified School District identified Clairemont High School's mascot "Chieftain" as the first to be renamed by its newly formed renaming committee. The name is one specifically banned by the California Racial Mascot Act that was passed in 2024.

== Sports ==
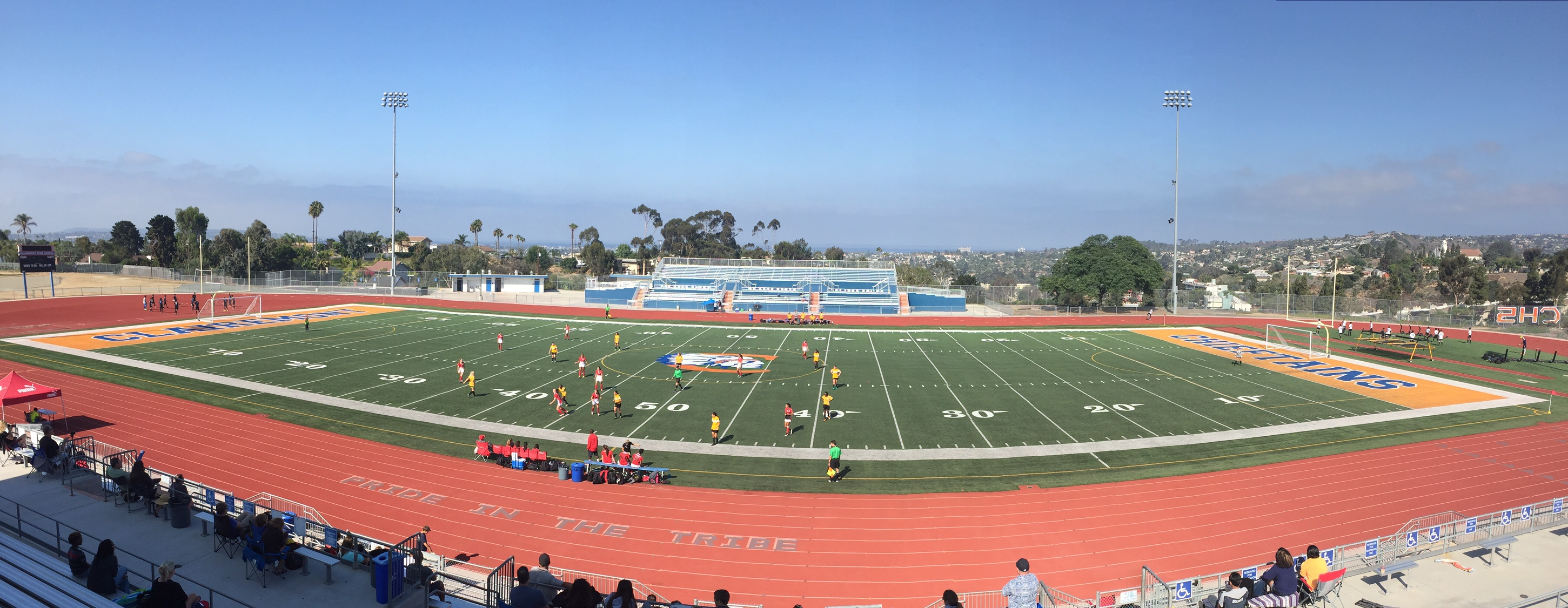
Clairemont High School's sports field overlooks the Pacific Ocean.

Clairemont's mascot is the Captains (formerly Chieftains), the school newspaper is The Arrow, and the annual is The Calumet (which is a ceremonial pipe used for special occasions by early native American tribes).

== Mascot ==
Due to the need for the change in the school's mascot, the naming committee held meetings in the cafeteria of the school. These were open for attendance from community members as well as students and staff. They came to the decision to change the mascot from the Chieftains to the Captains. This will be in full effect at the start of the 2026-27 school year.

== In popular culture ==
The movie Fast Times at Ridgemont High (and the book published first) was inspired by author Cameron Crowe's undercover research at Clairemont High School during the 1978-79 school year.

A track on the band Pierce the Veil's album Selfish Machines is titled "Fast Times at Clairemont High".

== Notable alumni ==
- Barbara Haskell (class of 1964), curator of the Whitney Museum of American Art
- Ken Henderson (class of 1964), former Major League Baseball player, 1965-1980
- Luís Alberto Urrea (class of 1973), poet, novelist, and essayist
- Kris Jenner (class of 1973), reality TV show personality, Keeping Up with the Kardashians
- Kelly Ward (class of 1974), actor, played Putzie in the film Grease
- Jennifer Batten (class of 1975), solo guitarist, toured with Jeff Beck and Michael Jackson
- Mike Winters (class of 1976), Major League Baseball umpire, 1990–2019
- Mo Gaffney (class of 1976), actress and comedian
- Thomas A. Shannon Jr. (class of 1976), American diplomat
- Bob Geren (class of 1979), baseball player, former manager of the Oakland Athletics and bench coach of the New York Mets, current bench coach for the Los Angeles Dodgers
- Andy Rathbone (class of 1979), author specializing in general interest computing books including the For Dummies series
- Anne Steinemann (class of 1979), international professor of engineering
- Casey Nicholaw (class of 1980), stage and musical actor, choreographer, and director
- David Oliver (class of 1980), actor, Another World, 21 Jump Street
- Kristen R. Ghodsee (class of 1988), writer and professor
- Aaron and Adam Weis (class of 1999), former child actors, public school teachers
- Kendra Wilkinson (class of 2003), Playboy model and reality-television personality
- Moala Tautuaa (class of 2008), professional basketball player
- Kevin Mitchell, baseball player and 1989 National League MVP, San Francisco Giants
- Tony Muser, former Major League Baseball manager
- Chris Bonner (Class of 2011), former college and AFL football player
