= Native American mascot laws and regulations =

United States laws for the use of Native American mascots

The use of terms and images referring to Native Americans/First Nations as the name or mascot for a sports team is a topic of public controversy in the United States and in Canada, arising as part of the Native American/First Nations civil rights movements. The retirement of the Washington Redskins and the Cleveland Indians has tipped public opinion in favor of eliminating Native mascots by public school, more states considering or passing legislation to do so, heeding tribal leaders who have advocating for change for decades.

Statewide laws or school board decisions mandating change have been passed in states with significant Native American population; other states also have official policies that encourage change in accordance with principles of establishing a proper environment for education. However, there has also been resistance and backlash, usually when statewide laws have been viewed as an intrusion into local communities, where no need for change has been established.

The documents most often cited to justifying the trend for change are an advisory opinion by the United States Commission on Civil Rights in 2001 and a resolution by the American Psychological Association in 2005. Both support the views of Native American organizations and individuals that such mascots maintaining harmful stereotypes that are discriminatory and cause harm by distorting the past and preventing understanding of Native American/First Nations peoples in the present.

Rex P. Shipp, the state representative for Cedar City, Utah, introduced in 2020 a joint resolution supporting "the appropriate use of names, images, and symbols of Native Americans and other indigenous people by schools or places" and discouraging "removing names, images, and symbols of Native Americans and other indigenous people from schools or places". Although not having the force of law, the resolution failed on party lines in 2021, with only a few Republicans voting in support. A similar resolution may be introduced in Idaho. Following the name change of the Cleveland Indians, two Ohio state representatives have introduced a resolution encouraging Ohio schools to eliminate Native American mascots.

== Arizona ==
A Native American legislator proposed a bill in 2018 that would have ban the use of a sports team name or logo at a publicly funded stadium if any Arizona tribe found it to be disparaging. While primarily aimed at the Washington Redskins, the ban could affect other professional and amateur teams.

== California ==
After two failed attempts at similar legislation in the early-2000s, Governor Jerry Brown signed AB 30—the "California Racial Mascots Act"—in October 2015, which prohibited state schools from using the name "Redskins". At the time of signing, four California schools were using the name "Redskins": Calaveras High School, Chowchilla Union High School, Gustine High School, and Tulare Union High School.

Effective January 1, 2017, schools would be prohibited from using the name "Redskins", or producing new signs, fixtures, publications, or materials containing the name. Signs and fixtures bearing the name "Redskins" did not have to be removed immediately, provided that they were removed the next time they are replaced "in the normal course of maintenance". A two-year grace period was granted for band and sports uniforms in limited quantities, in order to allow for replacements of lost or damaged uniforms.

Gustine High changed their name to the "Reds" in February 2016; the name was previously used by the school from 1913 to 1936, but changed due to its association with communism. Calaveras High School's students and faculty initially voted to remove the Redskins name, but not replace it. This remained the case until 2022, when students and faculty voted to adopt the new name "Red Hawks". Chowchilla and Tulare both renamed their teams "the Tribe"; Tulare's principal stated their intention to retain Native American imagery as much as possible, while the local Tule River tribe was also consulted.

While only explicitly applying to "Redskins", some institutions voluntarily reevaluated their use of other names and logos that could be considered derogatory to Native Americans, such as the Bakersfield City School District (which discontinued the use of Native American imagery at two schools that used the name "Warriors").

Although the four schools did cease use of the name "Redskins", some only followed the letter of the law and maintained their use of other Native American imagery such as logos. Fan behavior such as the "Tomahawk chop" were still common, as well as students continuing to wear clothing bearing their school's past "Rednecks" branding. Joely Proudfit, chair of Native American studies at California State University, San Marcos, and member of the Pechanga Band of the Luiseño tribe, argued that "there's no redeeming quality of the word 'Redskin' but to try to soften the blow by using 'Tribe' or 'Indian' or 'Warrior' is nonsensical. It just shows that the proponents of keeping these types of words in there don't understand or refuse to understand the harmful effects of stereotyping one particular population."

In October 2024, Governor Gavin Newsom signed AB 3074, a bill that expands the California Racial Mascots Act to apply to any school name or mascot that is considered "derogatory" to Native American communities (unless the school itself is operated by a recognized tribe), including but not limited to "Apaches", "Braves", "Chiefs", "Chippewa", "Indians", and "Tribe" among others. The expanded bill takes effect in July 2026; localities will be reimbursed for any costs associated with rebranding. Anticipating the enforcement of the law, Clark Intermediate in Clovis, California announced in December, 2025 that their mascot would change from Chieftains to Cougars. Only days later the North Fork Rancheria of Mono Indians of California announced that it would concent, as provided by the law, to having the school retain the Chieftains mascot.

== Colorado ==
In 2014 State lawmakers in Colorado began considering a bill that rather than a complete ban, would deny state funding to schools on a case by case basis, depending upon the name, logo, and local Native American support. Getting ahead of any potential law, Loveland High School in Loveland, Colorado, is "looking to a Lakota Sioux tribe for help creating a new mascot and a hands-on lesson in history and culture for the school." Although passed by the House by one vote, the bill failed in a Colorado Senate committee. Colorado Governor John Hickenlooper created by executive order a commission that held meetings where local community members, state agencies and Native Americans can seek to find common ground on the mascot issue. The commission issued a report in 2016 that advocated change, but only by local initiatives, not a statewide mandate.

In 2021 a bill was passed to ban Native mascots statewide, allowing continued use only for schools that had an agreement with a recognized tribe prior to June 1, 2021. Schools must change their mascots before June 1, 2022 or face a $25,000 per month fine that would go to the state's education fund. The bill was signed into law on June 28, 2021. A group called the Native American Guardians Association (NAGA) sued in the U.S. District Court to block implementation of the bill as violating the constitutional rights of those Native Americans who favor retaining Native names and imagery, asserting that there are culturally-sensitive uses. A member of the governor's commission, Darius Smith (Navajo), says that NAGA does not have credibility or represent the way many American Indians feel about the issue. In May, 2022 the judge dismissed the suit on the basis of NAGA having failed to establish standing to bring the case.

== Connecticut ==
The Speaker of the House Joe Aresimowicz announced the consideration of legislation to ban all Native American nicknames and logos in Connecticut. Aresimowicz cited the October 2019 decision of the Killingly school board to change their "Redmen" mascot followed by the January 2020 reversion of that decision by newly elected Republican officials "a mockery of the process". A statewide ban would effect 19 high schools, including Killingly.

Rather than passing a law directly banning mascots, there is a proposal in the Connecticut legislature, which is expected to pass, to withhold the portion of funding that comes to schools from the Mohegan and Mashantucket Pequot tribes' slot machine revenue if they continue to use the names or images referring to any state or federally recognized tribe. Schools would have a year to change their mascots before losing funding.

In June 2022 most schools had complied, but four school districts have decided to keep their mascots; the Derby Red Raiders, Killingly Redmen, Windsor Warriors and Nonnewaug High School Chiefs. Canton High School, Killingly High School and Windsor High School were ruled ineligible to receive grant funding in November 2022. Canton and Windsor do not receive grants, but Killingly will forfeit $94,184. Other towns, including the Derby Red Raiders will keep their mascot due to agreements with Native groups.

== Florida ==
The Hillsborough County School District, which includes Tampa, Florida, voted in May 2019 to examine all school mascots that use Native American names or logos. Five elementary and one middle school will select new mascots. Two high schools, George D. Chamberlain High School (Chiefs) and the East Bay High School (Indians) will keep their logos and names, but must stop doing chants and dances that invoke Native American rituals. However, after announcement of the decision, the response from some members of the public lead to meetings at which various opinions for and against change were expressed.

== Illinois ==
A bill was introduced in the Illinois General Assembly on February 9, 2024, prohibiting the use by any school of a native name, logo, or mascot. The bill was passed by the Illinois House in April, 2025.

== Iowa ==
Four Democratic members of the Iowa legislature have introduced a bill to eliminate Native mascots by 2024. The Meskwaki Nation issued a message to the 66 schools in Iowa currently using Native “themed” mascots to retire them.

== Kansas ==
A commission created by Kansas Governor Laura Kelly in 2021 recommended that schools should, with the Kansas Association for Native American Education (KANAE), examine and eliminate the use of Native American mascots and imagery. In November 2022 the state Board of Education recommended the elimination of Native mascots within five years unless approval is given by a local Federally recognized tribe.

== Maine ==
The Maine Education Department issued a notice in 2019 urging schools to refrain from using mascots and logos depicting Native Americans. After receiving statements in opposition to the "Indians" name from the Penobscot Nation and the ACLU of Maine, the school board voted in March 2019 to eliminate the mascot at Skowhegan Area High School. With the elimination of Native American imagery associated with the "Warriors" name at other high schools, Maine became the first state to eliminate indigenous mascots in all secondary schools. However, there continues to be local support for restoring the mascot in Skowhegan. Concurrent with local efforts, a bill to ban Native mascots statewide passed the Maine House of Representatives and Senate and was signed into law by Governor Janet Mills in May, 2019. The community of Salem Township is supportive of the change of the Strong Elementary School "Indians", the principal stating that half the students were not aware of the mascot name.

== Massachusetts ==
The 2023 legislature is considering identical bills in the House (H.477) and Senate (S.245), prohibiting the use of Native American mascots by schools but allowing any recognized tribe within the commonwealth to grant permission to use their particular tribal name. Schools may also continue to make use of anything currently showing the old mascot as long as they make no new purchases that include it, and have selected a new mascot. Similar bills were proposed in 2021, 2020, 2019 and 2017; none progressing beyond committee assignments.

== Michigan ==
The Michigan State Board of Education issued in 2003, and reaffirmed in 2010, a resolution that "supports and strongly recommends the elimination of American Indian mascots, nicknames, logos, fight songs, insignias, antics, and team descriptors by all Michigan schools."

In February 2013, the Michigan Department of Civil Rights (MDCR) filed a complaint with the US Department of Education's Office for Civil Rights (OCR). MDCR's complaint asserts that new research clearly establishes that use of American Indian imagery negatively impacts student learning, creating an unequal learning environment in violation of Article VI of the Civil Rights Act of 1964. In June 2013, the OCR dismissed the case on the basis that the legal standard required not only harm, but the intent to do harm, which was not established. One of the schools named in the MDCR complaint, Saranac Community Schools in Ionia County, Michigan plans to retain the name Redskins but has replaced the logo on its uniforms with a "Dreamcatcher" and the band will no longer play the "Tomahawk Song" at games.

The cost of removing Native American imagery has been a barrier to change, but a new Michigan Native American Heritage Fund will receive money for such changes due an amendment to the Tribal-State Gaming Compact between the Nottawaseppi Huron Band of the Potawatomi (NHBP) and the State of Michigan.

In March, 2017 the State Superintendent requested an opinion from the Michigan Attorney General whether he had the authority to fine school districts that failed to remove Native American mascots and logos that advocates argue are degrading and culturally insensitive. The Attorney General responded in July, 2017 that the Superintendent did not have the authority to impose such fines. Schools that consider their use of Native American imagery to be respectful include Huron High School in New Boston (Chiefs), Woodhaven High School in Brownstown Township (Warriors), and Roosevelt High School in Wyandotte. While the Wyandotte mascot is "Bears", their marching band is the "Marching Chiefs" with a Native American logo.

In 2017 a bill to ban the name Redskins was introduced in the Senate by Sen. Wayne Schmidt who represents a district which includes five tribal governments that support the ban. Also in 2017, Rep. Jewell Jones introduced a bill to ban all Native American mascots in Michigan. However, neither bill progressed beyond committee assignment.

== Minnesota ==
A law was passed in 2023 prohibiting schools from using any name, symbol or image that depicts or refers to an American Indian Tribe. Symbols include feathers, spears, tomahawks and Indigenous clothing. Schools within reservations having 95% American Indian students are exempt from this law. Individual schools may apply for an exemption, which will be denied if any one of the 11 tribes in the state object.

== Nebraska ==
The Legislature's State-Tribal Relations Committee considered in 2019 what action to take regarding Native American mascots in Nebraska, including a possible statewide requirement to eliminate them. Native tribes favor a requirement, while some legislators prefer allowing it to be a local decision. In 2022, a lawmaker proposed giving grants of up to $200,000 to schools that voluntarily changed their mascots.

== Nevada ==
A law was signed in June 2021 banning the use by schools and universities of racially discriminatory identifiers associated with any federally recognized Indian tribe exempt those having agreements with a local tribe. The bill also prohibits the historical practice of sounding a siren to warn non-white people to leave town before sundown, which had continued in some northern Nevada towns despite the ordinances having been repealed decades ago.

== New Hampshire ==
In 2022, the New Hampshire House rejected a bill banning Native mascots, voting 170 to 143. The New Hampshire Board of Education endorse the prohibition 20 years ago.

== New York ==
The New York State Education Department (NYSED) issued a memo in November 2022 requiring schools with a Native American mascot to find a replacement by the end of the 2022-23 school year. In May, 2023 the deadline was revised to June 2025. Schools could then ask for an extension, but must show that they have made a good faith effort to comply. Those schools that fail to do so without current approval from a recognized tribe may be in willful violation of the Dignity for All Students Act. The penalties for such a violation include the removal of school officers and the withholding of State Aid. Opponents of change often cite the cost of removing the old name and logo from uniforms, buildings and other places.

Massapequa school district on Long Island has filed a lawsuit against the New York State Board of Regents, accusing the agency of violating its first amendment rights by banning the use of its Native American mascot, the Chief. Three other school districts have also filed lawsuits, which the state is seeking to combine.

In December, 2023 the New York Supreme Court, Appellate Division unanimously dismissed the Cambridge Central School District appeal as "moot." In December, 2025 a federal court threw out a separate suit by the Massapequa School District which claimed support for their mascot from a Native American group, but that agreement was not found legally valid.

=== History ===
State legal action began in 2021 when Cambridge Central School District voted to change the Indians mascot, but soon reversed that decision after the election of a new school board member. The state Commissioner of Education ruled that the original decision to remove the mascot must stand, which Cambridge appealed. The result of the lawsuit in favor of the state is deem precedent for application of anti-discrimination law to Native mascots. In response to the memo, Cambridge has posted on their website that they will continue to pursue appeals the court and the commissioner's decisions. The president of the Seneca Nation said that the NYSED memo was a positive step.

In 2001, the NYSED sent a letter to all Presidents of Boards of Education and Superintendents of Public Schools in the state with the results of a study concluding that, while the use of Native American symbols is part of the deeply felt traditions in some communities, and many believe that mascots honor or pay tribute to Native Americans and their culture; most Native Americans appear to find the portrayal by others of their treasured cultural and religious symbols disparaging and disrespectful. Local schools should therefore proceed to eliminate Native American mascots as soon as practicable. Change was voluntary, and the majority of schools in New York retained their mascots during the following 20 years, 60 continuing to do so.

In response to the 2001 NYSED letter, the Seneca Nation Tribal Council joined with other members of the community in seeking to retain the Salamanca Central High School "Warriors" imagery, although with individual differences of opinion. The city is within the boundaries of the Allegany Indian Reservation of the Seneca Nation of Indians, and 26% of the high school students are Native American. The school logo now depicts a Seneca man, replacing the stereotypical Plains Indian warrior image that was used prior to 1978.

== North Carolina ==
The State Advisory Council on Indian Education, in its annual report for 2023 to the State Board of Education, as it has since 2002, urges "all public school administrators and boards of education to review and implement local policies related to the selection of athletic mascots, and to educate all school personnel on the long-term, damaging effects to students when inappropriate images and messages dishonor the American Indian culture".

== Oregon ==
On May 17, 2012, the Oregon State Board of Education voted 5–1 to adopt a rule prohibiting Oregon public schools from using Native American names, symbols, or images as school mascots; giving schools until July 1, 2017 to comply. Fifteen high schools using the nicknames Indians, Warriors, Braves and Chieftains were affected. However, Native American response was not unanimous; out of nine Federally recognized tribes in the state, two voiced opposition to the statewide ban on the basis of tribal sovereignty. Leaders said that there might have been an opportunity for developing an educational program for all students to learn about true native culture. In 2014 a state law was passed allowing schools to consult with nearby Native American tribes on acceptable names and imagery. While some Native Americans support such relationships with their local schools, Native American students who compete in athletics with these schools state that they are sometimes uncomfortable with the imagery used, and some groups maintain that the use of Native mascots needs to end everywhere. "These mascots undermine the educational experience of all students, particularly those with little or no contact with indigenous or native Alaskan peoples," said Se-Ah-Dom Edmo, interim president of the Oregon Indian Education Association.

In May 2015 the Board of Education unanimously voted down an amendment that would have allowed schools to retain their current names and mascots, maintaining the 2017 deadline for change. However, in January 2016 the board decided to grant exemptions to schools if they work out agreements with local tribes. Two schools have decided not to seek the approval of any tribe, citing the difficulty of doing so. The Fort Vannoy Elementary "Indians" (now the "Nobles") and Fleming Middle School "Rogues" (now the "Cavaliers"), both in the Three Rivers School District have changed their mascots. Rather than seek approval from any of the many tribes in the area, The Dalles High School decided to change from the "Eagle Indians" to become the Riverhawks in 2014. Warrenton High School now uses a generic sword and shield logo while retaining its Warriors name.

The Confederated Tribes of Grand Ronde entered into negotiations with four high schools on the conditions of removing some imagery and implementing a native history curriculum: Banks High School Mohawk High School, Molalla High School and Scappoose High School. However, after further consideration, Mohawk High School in Marcola, Oregon will drop its "Mohawk Indian" name because its imagery refers to an east coast tribe, the only connection being the local Mohawk Valley. In 2019, the school board is considering changing the name of the school and the school district in addition to removing a mural using Native American imagery.

The Marcola school board has tentatively select "Mustangs" as the new mascot. The agreement with Banks High School includes replacement of the old logo featuring a Native American in profile with one using inverse Bs in the shape of an arrowhead, which was designed with assistance from Nike marketing and graphics employees. The Department of Education Government and Legal Affairs Manager recommended acceptance of the agreement at an initial hearing on February 23, 2017. It is estimated that removal of the old Braves logo from the building and uniforms will cost $95,000 over the next five years.

The Oregon State Board of Education approved the Philomath School District's five-year agreement with the Confederated Tribes of Siletz Indians for the continued use of the high school's Warriors and the middle school's Braves. Also approved was an agreement with the Amity High School Warriors. The Siletz were one of the tribes that opposed the original 2012 ban, and wants the Siletz Valley Charter School in the town adjacent to the Siletz Reservation to remain the Warriors. Rogue River High School has eliminated their image of a Native American, using instead a spear. In exchange for retaining their Chieftains mascot, Rogue River will add a curriculum on true Native American history, and specifically, the Siletz tribal history.

Roseburg High School would remain the Indians with the agreement of the Cow Creek Band of Umpqua Tribe of Indians.

The Reedsport Community Charter School Braves sought tribal approval. However, three local tribes; the Coos, Lower Umpqua and Siuslaw, the Coquille, and the Siletz do not agree that the "Reedsport Braves" is honorable way to represent their tribes. In an effort to retain part of their tradition, some in the community are thinking of changing to "Brave" and eliminating all Native American imagery. At a meeting of the residents and the school's Native American Name and Image Committee, one of the committee members asked how many preferred no change, with an overwhelming majority of those present agreeing. However, it was stated that was not an option.

Schools with the Warrior team name may keep it by removing any Native American imagery: Lebanon High School and Oakridge High School. At Lebanon, only Native images deemed to be artwork not associated with the team will remain. However, the state has issued a notice of non-compliance to North Douglas High School, although the school superintendent has stated that all Native American references have been removed.

== Pennsylvania ==
A lawsuit was settled allowing a student club opposing the use of the "Raider" mascot and logo to have equal status with other clubs in the Twin Valley School District, Berks County, Pennsylvania. Christopher Rabb, a state representative in Philadelphia, issued a memo stating his intention to draft legislation banning all such mascots in the state.

== South Dakota ==
In January 2016 the South Dakota High School Activities Association passed a resolution asking all schools in the state to drop Native American nicknames and mascots. A bill was introduced in the South Dakota Legislature "to prohibit school districts from using school or athletic team names, mascots, or nicknames that are determined to be racially derogatory or discriminatory", but failed to pass by a vote of 22 to 46. Bills to ban discriminatory mascots were introduced in 2020 and 2022 but failed in committee.

== Tennessee ==
Opposing the trend for change, in response to the Tennessee Commission of Indian Affairs (TCIA) seeking a ban on certain race-based mascots in the state through the Tennessee Human Rights Commission, the 2007 Tennessee Legislature passed a law that: "state agencies may not require, prohibit, or impair the right of any public or private institution to continue to honor certain persons or cultures through the use of symbols, names, and mascots." Public Chapter 371, 2007. One of the dissenting legislators characterized the law as protection for bullies who want to continue to insult and degrade Native Americans. The TCIA also opposed the law, stating in their testimony that it denies Native Americans equal protection under the law and the right to defend their sacred ceremonies and artifacts from misuse and caricature.

== Texas ==
In December 2013 the Houston Independent School District by unanimous vote passed a preliminary plan to eliminate all ethnically sensitive names and mascots, one of which was the Lamar High School Redskins. The then Washington Redskins issued a statement repeating its position that such names are not offensive to many Native Americans, but rather are a source of pride. In April 2014 the schools affected by the policy announced new names: the Lamar High School Redskins will become the Texans, both the Hamilton Middle School Indians and Westbury High School Rebels will be the Huskies and the Welch Middle School Warriors will be the Wolf Pack. The initial cost of the change was $50,000 for new fall uniforms, and there will be additional costs such as changing names and logos on facilities. The total cost is estimated to be $250,000. However it was noted that team uniforms are periodically replaced anyway, so the cost is not due only to the name changes. "The moral cost to our reputation as a diverse district -- where we care about the sensitivities of every single individual -- would be incalculable if we were not to do this," HISD superintendent Terry Grier said.

== Vermont ==
A 2022 bill was introduced in the state Senate to "...prohibit a public school from having or adopting a name, symbol, or image that depicts or refers to a racial or ethnic group, individual, custom, or tradition and that is used as a mascot, nickname, logo, letterhead, or team name of the school."

== Washington ==
On September 24, 1993 the Washington State Board of Education (WSBE) passed a resolution encouraging all state schools to end the use of Native American mascots This was reiterated by a similar resolution in 2012.

In the absence of mandatory regulations, change came only as individual schools have addressed the issue. Bellingham High School had a Native American mascot until it was closed for renovation. When it reopened in 2000, the mascot was changed to a bird of prey, but the name "Red Raiders" was retained. The Seattle-area Issaquah School District adopted a policy banning symbols based on racial stereotypes; resulting in a change of the Issaquah High School team from the "Indians" to the "Eagles" in 2003 over the protest of some students. The "Indian Head" logo used by the Clover Park High School "Warriors" has been replaced by a block "CP" with a spear.

In January 2021 a bill was introduced in the state legislature "prohibiting the inappropriate use of Native American names, symbols, or images as public school mascots, logos, or team names". The bill was initiated by Rep. Debra Lekanoff a member of the Tlingit tribe and the only Native American member of the legislature. Lekanoff is motivated by the change in the name of the Washington Football Team in 2020, which indicates a willingness of the general public to address issues regarding the use of Native mascots. The bill passed in the state House of Representatives in February 2021 by 92 to 5 and passed the Senate on April 6 with a vote of 40 to 9. The law will take effect at the end of the 2021-2022 school year and allow schools to retain names with the consent of a nearby tribe. Governor Jay Inslee signed the bill into law on April 26, 2021. The Spokane Tribe has decided not to honor any request by schools to retain their mascots. Two schools, Kamiakin High School (Braves) in Kennewick and Legacy High School (Thunderbirds) in Vancouver, Washington are seeking the approval of the Confederated Tribes and Bands of the Yakama Nation to retain their mascots based upon their curriculum which includes tribal history, culture and government.

== Wisconsin ==
In 2010 a law was passed in Wisconsin to eliminate race-based nicknames, logos and mascots in schools; but allowing retention if they have the permission of local Native American tribes. Many mascots were changed either voluntarily or in response to complaints. However, in October 2013 the law was changed to make it more difficult by requiring the complainant to collect signatures of 10% of the school district's population and prove discrimination, while under the 2010 law only one petitioner was needed, and the burden of proof was on the school to disprove racism. Although now allowed to do so, some schools that have already made a change have decided not to restore their prior mascots. Native American groups opposed the change in the law. Delivering the State of the Tribes address to the Wisconsin legislature in March 2015; Mole Lake Sokaogon Chairman Chris McGeshik stated: "We believe the recent decision to override the progress made with the state in regard to the school mascots to be a mockery of the indigenous people in the state and around America."

In his 2019 State of the Tribes address, Oneida Nation Chairman Tehassi Hill proposed amending Wisconsin Education Act 31, which requires instruction on the history, culture and tribal sovereignty of the federally recognized tribes located in the State, to focus on the removal of Native American imagery in public facilities; stating "Teach respect, not racism".

Prompted by the concerns of Native Americans, the Madison Metropolitan School District in Wisconsin has implemented a policy banning student clothing having "words, pictures, or caricatures based on negative stereotypes of a specific gender, ethnicity, nationality, religion, sexual orientation or disability", which would ban all sports apparel displaying Native American mascot names, images or logos. However the ban may not pass the legal test that freedom of speech does not allow for a ban on expression unless there is a "substantial disruption of the educational mission". Visiting athletic teams will also be asked to leave behind Native American mascots and logos, otherwise the game could be canceled.

A 2019 resolution to ban Native mascots statewide was addressed to the Wisconsin Association of School Boards. The resolution has the support of the Appleton Area School District, Madison Metropolitan School District, the Wausau School District and the Lacrosse School Board, with additional school boards scheduled to add their support.

In 2023 a letter, signed by state and national organizations representing Native Americans, was sent to the 26 school districts that continue to use Native mascots. The letter requests a dialog to "learn about contemporary Tribal Nations and Native peoples and why these mascots degrade us, misrepresent who we are and dismiss the many important contributions we have made, and continue to make, to this country."
