= Joely Proudfit =

Native American studies professor

Joely Proudfit is an American academic and Native American studies professor who also works as an executive consultant for Hollywood media and films. The first of her family to complete high school and obtain a college degree, she went on to obtain a Ph.D. in political science and American Indian studies before becoming a multi-tenured professor in the California State University system.

In addition to organizing and promoting California’s American Indian & Indigenous Film Festival (CAIIFF), she was also appointed to several state and national committees for women and Native Americans. She also assisted in positive and accurate representations of Native Americans in films like Hostiles and shows like Stumptown.

== Childhood and education ==
Born as a part of the Pechanga Band of the Luiseño Mission Indians from the Ngeesikat clan, Proudfit (Luiseño/Payómkawichum and Tongva) spent her childhood in Southern California, where she faced food and housing insecurity as well as family instability, becoming the first member of her immediate family to graduate from high school. Her original plan after graduation was to join the military so she'd have a place to live and sleep, but decided to join California State University, Long Beach instead and lived in the dorms. Earning a Bachelor's degree from CSU Long Beach in political science with an emphasis on public law, she continued her education at Northern Arizona University and earned a master's degree and a Ph.D. in political science, with an emphasis in public policy and American Indian studies.

== Career ==
While active in academia, Proudfit also joined state political administrations as an advisor in the early 2000's, such as the office of Cruz Bustamante. At the same time, she was the TV spokeswoman for both campaigns promoting California's 1998 and 2000 Proposition 5 bills that allowed gambling on tribal lands in the state. As a professor at CSU Long Beach, she would end up earning tenure from three separate universities in the CSU system, first San Francisco State University, then CSU San Bernardino, and lastly CSU San Marcos, where she has stayed as tenured professor. She teaches the class Imagining Indians: American Indians, Media, Film and Society at CSU San Marcos. She was made head of the American Indian Studies department and of the California Indian Culture and Sovereignty Center in 2008.

Proudift was a founder of the annual California’s American Indian & Indigenous Film Festival (CAIIFF) in 2013 and stayed on as an executive director. In February 16, she was added to the National Advisory Council on Indian Education by President Barack Obama in order to assist in the education of Native American children. She was appointed in July 2021 to the California Commission on the Status of Women and Girls by Governor Gavin Newsom, which made her the first Indigenous woman to ever be on the commission. She runs two companies that she founded: Naqmayam Communications, a public relations company for Indigenous organizations, and Native Media Strategies, a company that tries to improve the representation of Indigenous actors in movies and television. She has worked as a production consultant for various film and TV shows, such as Hostiles, Stumptown, and Chelsea Does. To assist in film representation of American Indians, Proudfit created the organization The Native Networkers with Chris Eyre.

== Awards and honors ==
The title of American Indian Heritage Month Local Hero was given to Proudfit in November 2016 by KPBS. She was named one of the Entertainment Educators of the Year by Variety for 2022.

== Bibliography ==
- — (2018). Beyond the American Indian Stereotype: There's More to Me Than What You See. ABC-Clio. p. 245. ISBN 9781440851025.
- —; Myers-Lim, Nicole Quinderro, eds. (2017). On Indian Ground: California. Information Age Publishing. p. 284. ISBN 9781681239149.
