= Kevin Eakin =

American gridiron football player (born 1981)

No. 9
- Position: Quarterback

Personal information
- Born: July 22, 1981 (age 45); St. Paul, Minnesota, U.S.
- Listed height: 6 ft 1 in (1.85 m)
- Listed weight: 225 lb (102 kg)

Career information
- High school: Marjory Stoneman Douglas (Parkland, Florida)
- College: Fordham
- NFL draft: 2004: undrafted

Career history
- New York Jets (2005)*; → Frankfurt Galaxy (2005); Hamilton Tiger-Cats (2005–2006); Buffalo Bills (2007)*; → Frankfurt Galaxy (2007); Tennessee Valley/Alabama Vipers (2008–2010); Georgia Force (2012); Alabama Hammers (2013–2014)
- * Offseason or practice squad member only

Awards and highlights
- 2× First-team All-Patriot League (2002–2003); PIFL champion (2013)

Career CFL statistics
- Passing yards: 1,127
- TD–INT: 6–11
- Passer rating: 57.3
- Stats at CFL.ca (archived)

Career AFL statistics
- Comp. / Att.: 286 / 465
- Passing yards: 3,417
- TD–INT: 54–15
- Passer rating: 99.55
- Rushing TD: 1
- Stats at ArenaFan.com

Kevin Eakin (born July 22, 1981) is an American former professional football player who was a quarterback in the Canadian Football League (CFL), Arena Football League (AFL), and NFL Europe. He played college football for the Fordham Rams and was signed by the New York Jets of the National Football League (NFL) as a street free agent in 2005.

Eakin was also a member of the Frankfurt Galaxy, Hamilton Tiger-Cats, Buffalo Bills, Tennessee Valley/Alabama Vipers, Georgia Force and Alabama Hammers.

== Early life ==
Eakin attended Marjory Stoneman Douglas High School in Parkland, Florida and was a student and a letterman in football, basketball, and track. In football, he was a team captain and was named to the All-Broward County team. Eakin graduated from Marjory Stoneman Douglas High School in 2000.

== College career ==
Eakin was a two-year starter for the Rams at Fordham University, starting his junior year and compiling a 19–6 record from 2002–2003, with 6,112 yards passing and 45 touchdowns for his career. In 2002, he led the Rams to their first ever Patriot League title.

== Professional career ==
=== New York Jets ===
Eakin originally was signed by the New York Jets, who allocated him to the Frankfurt Galaxy of NFL Europe, where he was the starting quarterback ahead of former heralded #3 overall draft pick Akili Smith. After being invited to Jets training camp in 2005, he appeared in 2 preseason games and was the last person cut before the season.

=== Hamilton Tiger-Cats ===
Eakin spent the next season in the Canadian Football League with the Hamilton Tiger-Cats, and spent most of the season as backup to controversial starter Jason Maas.

=== Buffalo Bills ===
After the 2006 CFL season, Eakin went right across the border and signed with the NFL's Buffalo Bills, who once again allocated him to Frankfurt. With the demise of NFL Europa, Eakin returned to Buffalo, but because of depth issues (he stood fourth behind J. P. Losman, Craig Nall, and draft pick Trent Edwards), he saw no playing time and was released. However, after the release of third string QB Craig Nall, Eakin was signed onto the Buffalo Bills practice squad to serve as the team's emergency quarterback.

=== Team Alabama ===
Eakin signed with Team Alabama of the All American Football League for the 2008 season, but the league was postponed indefinitely.

=== Tennessee Valley / Alabama Vipers ===
In 2008 Eakin joined the Tennessee Valley Vipers of the af2. He was the starter for the final 15 games of the season, including the four playoff wins. He led them to the Championship Game. He re-signed with the Vipers for the 2009 season.
