= Chris Bonner =

American football player (born 1993)

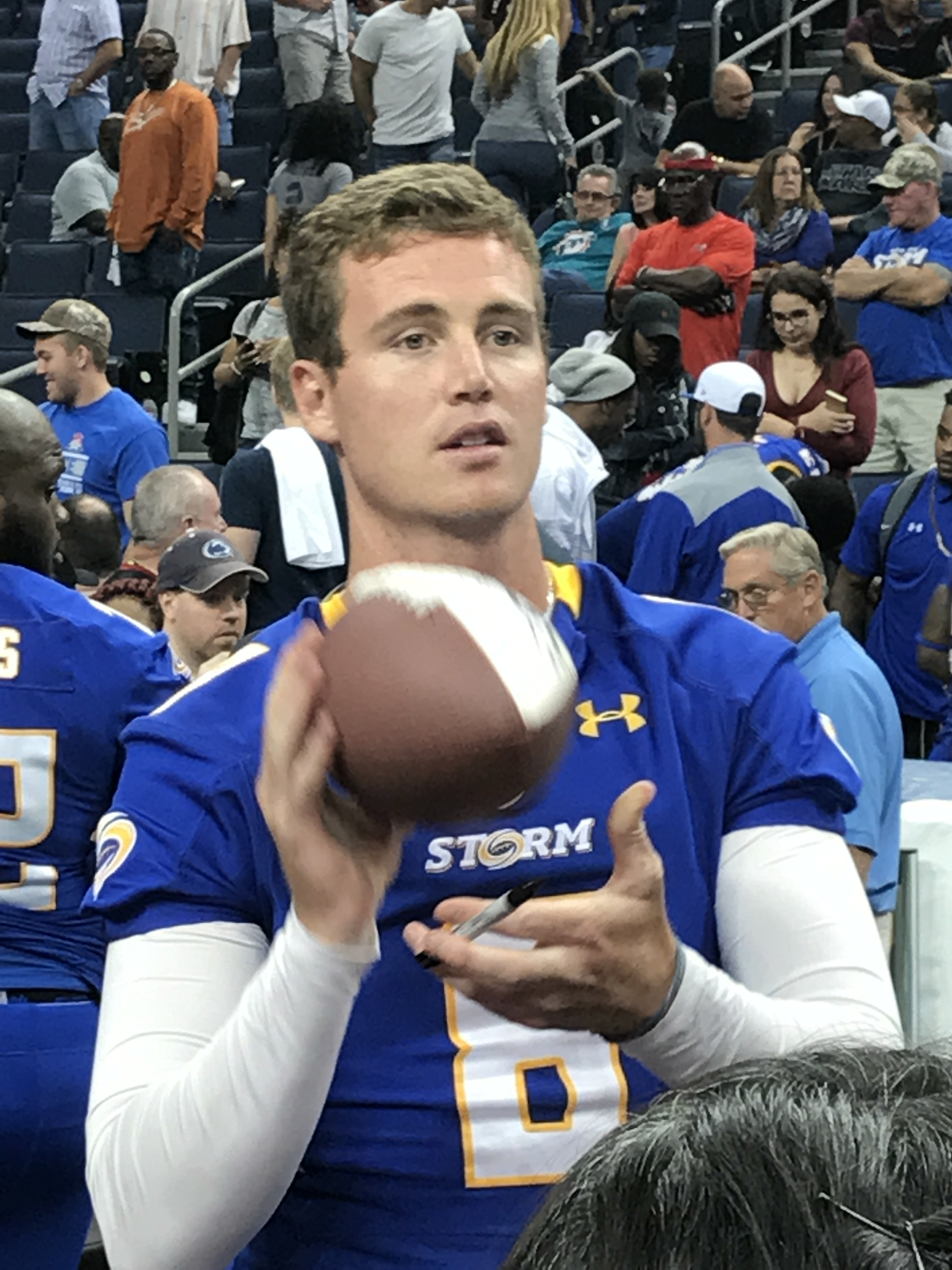
- Bonner in 2017

No. 8
- Position: Quarterback

Personal information
- Born: July 20, 1993 (age 33); San Diego, California, U.S.
- Listed height: 6 ft 6 in (1.98 m)
- Listed weight: 235 lb (107 kg)

Career information
- High school: Clairemont (San Diego, California)
- College: Grossmont, CSU Pueblo
- NFL draft: 2015: undrafted

Career history
- Tampa Bay Storm (2017)

Awards and highlights
- NCAA Division II Football Championship (2014)

Career AFL statistics
- Comp. / Att.: 15 / 27
- Passing yards: 227
- TD–INT: 4–1
- Passer rating: 105.02
- Rushing TD: 0
- Stats at ArenaFan.com

Chris Bonner (born July 20, 1993) is an American former professional football quarterback. He played college football at Colorado State University Pueblo and attended Clairemont High School in San Diego, California. He has been a member of the Tampa Bay Storm of the Arena Football League (AFL).

== Early life ==
Bonner attended Clairemont High School in San Diego.

== College career ==
Bonner played for the Grossmont Griffins from 2011 to 2012. He was the team's starter both years and helped the Griffins to 24 wins. After graduating from Grossmont, Bonner transferred to CSU Pueblo. As a senior, Bonner lead the ThunderWolves to the NCAA Division II Football Championship.

== Professional career ==
Pre-draft measurables
Height	Weight	40-yard dash	10-yard split	20-yard split	20-yard shuttle	Three-cone drill	Vertical jump	Broad jump
6 ft 6 in (1.98 m)	231 lb (105 kg)	5.12 s	1.76 s	2.98 s	4.60 s	7.56 s	27 in (0.69 m)	8 ft 6 in (2.59 m)
All values from CSU Pueblo Pro Day

Bonner attended the Carolina Panthers mini camp in May 2015. He struggled at the mini camp, and was not offered a contract. He was invited to the Kansas City Chiefs rookie minicamp on a tryout basis in May 2015. He was not signed to a contract at the conclusion of the rookie minicamp.

On January 10, 2017, Bonner was assigned to the Tampa Bay Storm of the Arena Football League. He was the backup to Randy Hippeard in 2017 and appeared in four games. He attempted his first pass on July 22 against the Cleveland Gladiators. He relieved Hippared during the second quarter of the final game of the regular season on August 5, completing 15 of 26 passes for 227 yards, 4 touchdowns and 1 interception as the Storm lost to the Philadelphia Soul by a score of 41–28. The Storm folded in December 2017.
