= Anne C. Steinemann =

American civil and environmental engineering academic

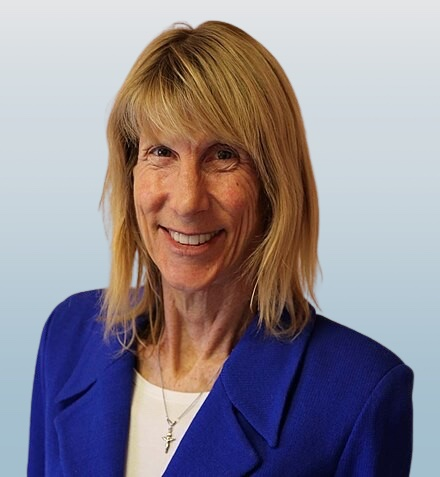
- Professor Anne C. Steinemann
- Education: Stanford University; University of California, Los Angeles; University of California, Irvine
- Known for: Research on; Fragranced consumer products: Emissions, exposures, and effects; Indoor air quality; Disaster risk reduction
- Scientific career
- Fields: Civil engineering, environmental engineering
- Workplaces: Stanford University; Georgia Institute of Technology; University of Washington; Scripps Institution of Oceanography; Linköping University; Florida Institute of Technology; Stanford University; University of Melbourne; James Cook University

Anne C. Steinemann is an American civil and environmental engineering academic who has specialized chiefly in the fields of "healthy built environments, indoor air quality, consumer product emissions and exposures, drought management, and climate-related hazards", with a focus on engineering and sustainability. Currently professor of civil engineering at the University of Melbourne and professor of engineering at James Cook University, she has also advised numerous government and industry bodies in the United States and Australia and appeared widely in press, radio, television and website segments communicating her findings to the general public.

== Early life and education ==
In 1984 Steinemann graduated from the University of California, Irvine with a B.S. (magna cum laude) in civil and environmental engineering. In 1985 she graduated from University of California, Los Angeles with a M.S. in civil and environmental engineering. In 1993 she was awarded a Ph.D. by Stanford University in civil and environmental engineering.

== Career ==
Steinemann began her professional career as an assistant/associate professor at the Georgia Institute of Technology (1995–2004), professor of civil and environmental engineering and professor of public affairs at the University of Washington (2004–2013), and program manager at the Scripps Institution of Oceanography (2012–2015). While at the University of Washington, she served as Director of The Water Center. While at Scripps, she led the federal drought preparedness program for the State of California, receiving the state's Climate Services Award for this work.

Steinemann was appointed as acting/visiting professor at Linköping University (1988–1989), Florida Institute of Technology (2001–2012), and Stanford University (2010–2011).

From 2015 she has been professor of civil engineering in the Department of Infrastructure Engineering at the University of Melbourne. From 2018 she has also been professor of engineering and chair of sustainable infrastructure at James Cook University, Australia.

Steinemann has been named in Stanford University’s list of the top 2% of scientists and engineers worldwide, ever since its inception in 2019.

== Pollutant exposures, indoor air quality, fragranced consumer products ==
Steinemann has focused much of her later research on "pollutant exposures and associated health effects, including topics of indoor air quality, consumer product testing and evaluation, exposure assessment, and healthy homes and communities".

She has published research papers and monographs on the health effects of fragranced products (such as perfume, household cleaners, laundry supplies, personal care products, scented candles and air fresheners), concluding that those products "impair rather than improve indoor air quality" and "pose a range of health and economic risks".

She has found that emissions of carcinogenic and hazardous air pollutants from "green" and "organic" fragranced products were not significantly different from regular fragranced products and could release potentially dangerous chemicals.

Furthermore, she has noted that "relatively few ingredients of the fragranced product emissions" are "disclosed to the public", that "more than 156 VOCs were emitted from the 37 fragranced consumer products" examined by her, and that of those "156 VOCs, 42 VOCs were classified as toxic or hazardous under US federal laws, and each product emitted at least one of these chemicals". However, of more than 550 volatile ingredients emitted from these products, fewer than three percent were disclosed on any label or safety data sheet.

Her nationally representative population studies found that 34.7% of adults in the US, 33.0% in Australia, 33.1% in Sweden, and 27.8% of people in the United Kingdom report sensitivity to fragranced products. Adverse health effects include asthma attacks, breathing difficulties, migraine headaches, dizziness, seizures, rashes, and gastrointestinal problems, with women reporting more adverse effects than men. The effects are also economic with "more than 20% of respondents entering a business, but leaving as quickly as possible if they smell air fresheners or some fragranced product".

Further, 15.1% of Americans report they lost workdays or lost a job, in the previous year, due to illness from fragranced product exposure in the workplace. Personal costs due to these lost workdays and lost jobs were estimated at $132 billion in one year (2016).

Health effects from exposure to fragranced products can be so severe as to be disabling, according to her studies. Across the four countries (US, Australia, Sweden, and the United Kingdom), 9.5% of the general population report adverse health effects that could be considered disabling, according to legislation in each country.

Fragrance-free environments were preferred by a strong majority of the population across four countries, as her studies found. For instance, more than twice as many Americans would prefer that workplaces, health care facilities and professionals, hotels, and airplanes were fragrance-free rather than fragranced.

== Awards ==
- 2014, Climate Science Service Award, Department of Water Resources (State of California), for developing "useful science" to "bridge between the academic research community and practitioners".
- 2011, Engineer of the New Millennium, National Science Foundation.
- 1998, CAREER Award, National Science Foundation.

== Selected publications ==
=== Books ===
- Steinemann, Anne C. (July 2, 2020). Fragranced consumer products: emissions, exposures, effects. July 2, 2020. ISBN 979-8657596984.
- Steinemann, Anne (15 July 2019). "Ten questions concerning fragrance-free policies and indoor environments". Building and Environment. 159 106054. Bibcode:2019BuEnv.15906054S. doi:10.1016/j.buildenv.2019.03.052. ISSN 0360-1323.
- Steinemann, Anne C. (January 1, 2018). Microeconomics for Public Decisions (3rd ed.). Anne Steinemann. ISBN 978-0692174074.
- Ott, Wayne R.; Steinemann, Anne C.; Wallace, Lance A., eds. (2006). Exposure Analysis (1st ed.). Boca Raton, Florida: Taylor & Francis; CRC Press. doi:10.1201/9781420012637. ISBN 9780429138942.

=== Articles ===
- Steinemann, A (1 February 2021). "The fragranced products phenomenon: air quality and health, science and policy". Air Quality, Atmosphere & Health. 14 (2): 235–243. Bibcode:2021AQAH...14..235S. doi:10.1007/s11869-020-00928-1. hdl:11343/252193. ISSN 1873-9326.
- Steinemann, Anne (1 August 2019). "International prevalence of fragrance sensitivity". Air Quality, Atmosphere & Health. 12 (8): 891–897. Bibcode:2019AQAH...12..891S. doi:10.1007/s11869-019-00699-4. ISSN 1873-9326.
- Steinemann, A (March 2017). "Health and societal effects from exposure to fragranced consumer products". Preventive Medicine Reports. 5: 45–47. doi:10.1016/j.pmedr.2016.11.011. hdl:11343/121915. PMC 5122698. PMID 27896043.
- Steinemann, A (2016). "Fragranced consumer products: exposures and effects from emissions". Air Quality, Atmosphere, & Health. 9 (8): 861–866. Bibcode:2016AQAH....9..861S. doi:10.1007/s11869-016-0442-z. hdl:11343/121889. PMC 5093181. PMID 27867426.
- Steinemann, Anne (2015-06-01). "Volatile emissions from common consumer products". Air Quality, Atmosphere & Health. 8 (3): 273–281. Bibcode:2015AQAH....8..273S. doi:10.1007/s11869-015-0327-6. ISSN 1873-9326.
- Vandenbergh, Michael; Steinemann, Anne (1 December 2007). "The Carbon-Neutral Individual". New York University Law Review. 82 (6): 1673.
- Steinemann, Anne C. (1 October 2006). "Using Climate Forecasts for Drought Management". Journal of Applied Meteorology and Climatology. 45 (10): 1353–1361. Bibcode:2006JApMC..45.1353S. doi:10.1175/JAM2401.1. ISSN 1558-8432.

=== Lectures, Documentaries ===
See: Public Lectures and Documentaries

=== Media Coverage and Interviews ===
See: Media Coverage - in international print and electronic media
