= Rodney Hardeway =

American gridiron football player (born 1986)

Profile
- Position: Defensive end

Personal information
- Born: February 13, 1986 (age 40); Tyler, Texas, U.S.
- Listed height: 6 ft 3 in (1.91 m)
- Listed weight: 230 lb (104 kg)

Career information
- College: UL-Lafayette
- NFL draft: 2008: undrafted

Career history
- 2008: St. Louis Rams*
- 2009: Montreal Alouettes*
- 2010: Alabama Vipers
- 2011: Georgia Force
- * Offseason or practice squad member only

Awards and highlights
- First-team All-Sun Belt (2007)
- Stats at CFL.ca

Rodney Hardeway (born February 13, 1986) is a former professional Canadian football defensive end. He was signed as an undrafted free agent by the St. Louis Rams in 2008. He played college football for the UL-Lafayette Ragin' Cajuns.

Hardeway was also a member of the Montreal Alouettes.
