= 2010 Orlando Predators season =

Arena Football League team season

- Head coach: Pat O'Hara
- Home stadium: Amway Arena

Results
- Record: 8–8
- Division place: 3rd AC South
- Playoffs: Won Conference semifinals (Sharks) 73–69; Lost Conference Championship (Storm) 62–63

The 2010 Orlando Predators season was the 19th season for the franchise in the Arena Football League. The team was coached by Pat O'Hara and played their home games at Amway Arena. The Predators clinched a playoff berth for the 18th consecutive season by finishing fourth in the American Conference. In the opening round of the playoffs, the Predators defeated the Jacksonville Sharks with a last-second touchdown to win 73–69. Orlando then traveled to Tampa Bay to face the rival Storm for the third time in the season in the conference championship, but lost 62–63 after a would-be game-winning field goal fell short as time expired.

== Standings ==
South Division
Team	W	L	PCT	PF	PA	DIV	CON	Home	Away
z-Jacksonville Sharks	12	4	.750	893	806	4–2	8–2	7–1	5–3
x-Tampa Bay Storm	11	5	.687	926	812	3–3	8–4	6–2	5–3
x-Orlando Predators	8	8	.500	865	845	4–2	7–3	4–4	4–4
Alabama Vipers	7	9	0.437	812	860	1–5	7–9	5–3	2–6

z - Clinched division and conference's best record
x - Clinched playoff berth

== Regular season schedule ==
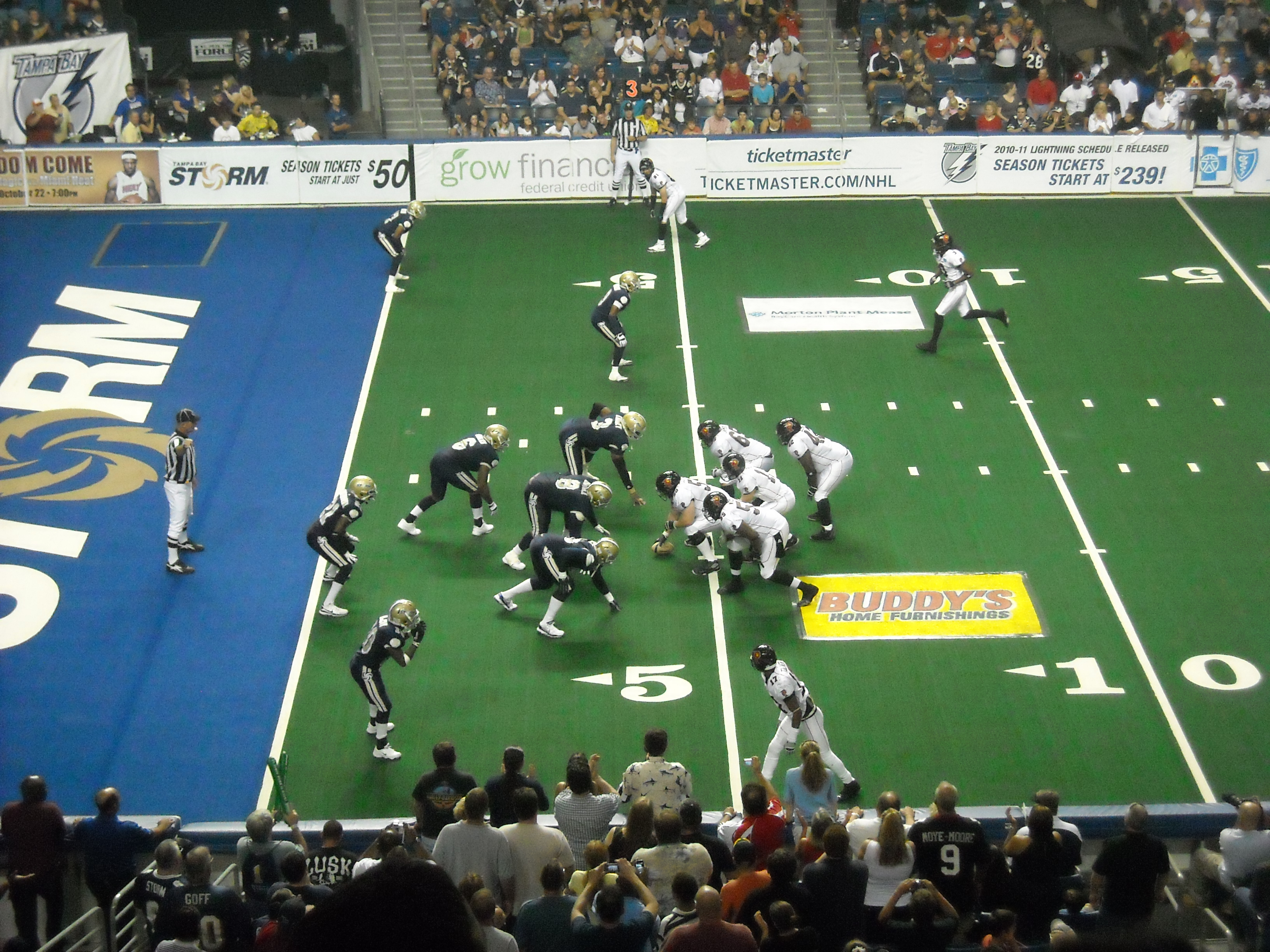
The Preds looking to score against the Tampa Bay Storm during the Week 18 matchup of The War on I-4.

The Predators did not open their season in the league's opening week, but instead in Week 2, on the road against the Battle Wings on April 10. Their first home game of the season took place on April 30 during Week 5 against the Barnstormers. The conclusion of the regular season was at the St. Pete Times Forum in Week 18 against the Storm in another edition of The War on I-4, on July 31.

Week	Day	Date	Kickoff	Opponent	Results		Location	Report
Week	Day	Date	Kickoff	Opponent	Score	Record	Location	Report
1	Bye							
2	Saturday	April 10	8:05 pm	at Bossier–Shreveport Battle Wings	L 67–73	0–1	CenturyTel Center	
3	Friday	April 16	8:05 pm	at Jacksonville Sharks	L 31–57	0–2	Jacksonville Veterans Memorial Arena	
4	Bye							
5	Friday	April 30	8:00 pm	Iowa Barnstormers	L 40–50	0–3	Amway Arena	
6	Friday	May 7	8:30 pm	at Dallas Vigilantes	W 70–59	1–3	American Airlines Arena	
7	Saturday	May 15	8:30 pm	at Alabama Vipers	W 48–31	2–3	Von Braun Center	
8	Friday	May 21	7:30 pm	Milwaukee Iron	W 58–54	3–3	Amway Arena	
9	Friday	May 28	8:00 pm	Tampa Bay Storm	L 50–62	3–4	Amway Arena	
10	Saturday	June 5	8:00 pm	at Tulsa Talons	W 57–54	4–4	BOK Center	
11	Saturday	June 12	7:30 pm	Spokane Shock	L 52–53	4–5	Amway Arena	
12	Friday	June 18	8:00 pm	Jacksonville Sharks	W 70–48	5–5	Amway Arena	
13	Saturday	June 26	8:00 pm	at Chicago Rush	L 42–55	5–6	Allstate Arena	
14	Saturday	July 3	7:30 pm	Cleveland Gladiators	L 70–77 (OT)	5–7	Amway Arena	
15	Friday	July 9	8:00 pm	Alabama Vipers	W 45–34	6–7	Amway Arena	
16	Saturday	July 17	8:00 pm	at Milwaukee Iron	L 41–57	6–8	Bradley Center	
17	Saturday	July 24	7:30 pm	Oklahoma City Yard Dawgz	W 49–21	7–8	Amway Arena	
18	Saturday	July 31	7:30 pm	at Tampa Bay Storm	W 75–60	8–8	St. Pete Times Forum	

All times are EDT

== Playoff schedule ==
Round	Day	Date	Kickoff	Opponent	Score	Location	Report
AC Semifinals	Friday	August 6	8:00 pm	at Jacksonville Sharks	W 73–69	Jacksonville Veterans Memorial Arena	
AC Championship	Saturday	August 14	7:30 pm	at Tampa Bay Storm	L 62–63	St. Pete Times Forum	

All times are EDT

== Roster ==
2010 Orlando Predators
Quarterbacks: 12 Glen Gauntt; 11 Nick Hill; Fullbacks: 42 James Lynch; -- Thomas Vann; Wide receivers: 18 Josh Bush; 15 Jerrian James; -- Sergio Joachim; 81 Robert Quiroga; 3 Bobby Sippio; 17 T. T. Toliver	Offensive linemen: 76 Bryan Bishop; 50 Justin Cleveland; -- Augustus Parrish; 55 Julius Wilson; Defensive linemen: 95 Arrion Dixon; 54 Paul Griffin; 98 Frisner Nelson; 44 Mark Robinson	Linebackers: 5 John Balous; 24 James Bryant; 9 Marlon Moye-Moore; Defensive backs: 21 Dion Byrum; 6 Rayshaun Kizer; 28 Kenny McEntyre; Kickers: 1 Carlos Martinez	Injured reserve: 96 E. J. Burt DL; 8 C. L. Grogan DB; 65 Chris Jamison OL; 87 Derrick Lewis WR; 2 Damon Mason DB; 61 Ryan Schmidt DL; 19 David Stanton DL; Refused to report: -- Amos Lamb OL; -- Julian Riley OL; -- Tommy Saunders WR; -- Cee Weatherington DL; Exempt list: 77 Patrick Afif OL; Suspension: -- Julius McClellan WR; rookies in italics

== Regular season ==
=== Week 2: at Bossier–Shreveport Battle Wings ===
Quarter	1	2	3	4	Total
Predators	7	26	13	21	67
Battle Wings	20	28	6	19	73

at CenturyTel Center, Bossier City, Louisiana

- Date: April 10
- Game time: 8:05 pm EDT
- Game attendance: 3,513
- Referee: Scott Vaughn
- Recap

Game information

1st quarter

- Bossier–Shreveport – P.J. Berry 17-yard pass from Raymond Philyaw (Art Carmody kick), 12:12
- Bossier–Shreveport – Randy Hymes 33-yard pass from Raymond Philyaw (Art Carmody kick no good), 8:16
- Orlando – Marlon Moye-Moore 1-yard run (Carlos Martinez kick), 4:09
- Bossier–Shreveport – P.J. Berry 24-yard pass from Raymond Philyaw (Art Carmody kick), 2:13

2nd quarter

- Orlando – Nick Hill 1-yard run (Carlos Martinez kick), 13:01
- Bossier–Shreveport – P.J. Berry 7-yard pass from Raymond Philyaw (Art Carmody kick), 10:32
- Orlando – Nick Hill 5-yard run (Carlos Martinez kick no good), 7:03
- Bossier–Shreveport – P.J. Berry 31-yard pass from Raymond Philyaw (Art Carmody kick), 6:19
- Orlando – James Lynch 1-yard run (Carlos Martinez kick), 3:51
- Bossier–Shreveport – Willis Marshall 18-yard pass from Raymond Philyaw (Art Carmody kick), 0:52
- Orlando – James Lynch 16-yard run (Carlos Martinez kick no good), 0:24
- Bossier–Shreveport – P.J. Berry 55-yard field goal return (Art Carmody kick), 0:00

3rd quarter

- Orlando – Derrick Lewis 11-yard pass from Nick Hill (Carlos Martinez kick), 12:15
- Bossier–Shreveport – Henry Bryant 1-yard pass from Raymond Philyaw (Art Carmody kick no good), 8:01
- Orlando – Nick Hill 1-yard run (Carlos Martinez kick no good), 2:24

4th quarter

- Bossier–Shreveport – P.J. Berry 20-yard pass from Raymond Philyaw (Art Carmody kick), 14:23
- Orlando – Robert Quiroga 7-yard pass from Nick Hill (Carlos Martinez kick), 10:01
- Bossier–Shreveport – Byron Douzart 2-yard run (Art Carmody kick no good), 8:41
- Orlando – T.T. Toliver 13-yard pass from Nick Hill (Carlos Martinez kick), 7:00
- Bossier–Shreveport – P.J. Berry 36-yard pass from Raymond Philyaw (Art Carmody kick no good), 2:08
- Orlando – T.T. Toliver 1-yard pass from Nick Hill (Carlos Martinez kick), 0:07

Passing

- Orlando – Nick Hill: 36/46, 381 yards, 4 TD
- Bossier–Shreveport – Raymond Philyaw: 26/33, 324 yards, 9 TD

Rushing

- Orlando – Nick Hill: 5 att, 17 yards, 3 TD
- Bossier–Shreveport – Byron Douzart: 8 att, 25 yards, 1 TD

Receiving

- Orlando – T.T. Toliver: 16 rec, 195 yards, 2 TD
- Bossier–Shreveport – P.J. Berry: 14 rec, 201 yards, 6 TD

The Predators lost their first game of the season in a close contest. A pivotal moment occurred as Carlos Martinez lined up to kick a field goal for the last play of the 1st half. Missing the attempt, the live ball was caught off the net by the Battle Wings' P.J. Berry, who was able to return it 55 yards for a touchdown. Instead of cutting into the Battle Wings' lead, the Predators were now down 48–33 at the half. The Preds managed to get within a touchdown at several points of the 2nd half, and scored a touchdown with 7 seconds left in the 4th quarter, but were unable to recover the ensuing onside kick, resulting in the loss. The Predators scored 6 of their 10 touchdowns on rushes, an uncommon sight in arena football.

=== Week 3: at Jacksonville Sharks ===
Quarter	1	2	3	4	Total
Predators	7	0	10	14	31
Sharks	14	10	21	12	57

at Jacksonville Veterans Memorial Arena, Jacksonville, Florida

- Date: April 16
- Game time: 8:05 pm EDT
- Game attendance: 11,179
- Recap

Game information

1st quarter

- Jacksonville – Jomo Wilson 3-yard pass from Aaron Garcia (Paul Edinger kick), 7:32
- Orlando – T.T. Toliver 9-yard pass from Nick Hill (Carlos Martinez kick), 2:24
- Jacksonville – Jomo Wilson 7-yard pass from Aaron Garcia (Paul Edinger kick), 0:59

2nd quarter

- Jacksonville – Kirby Griffin 3-yard run (Paul Edinger kick), 3:06
- Jacksonville – Paul Edinger 25-yard field goal, 0:07

3rd quarter

- Orlando – Carlos Martinez 29-yard field goal
- Jacksonville – Jomo Wilson 33-yard pass from Aaron Garcia (Paul Edinger kick), 8:36
- Orlando – Marlon Moye-Moore 4-yard run (Carlos Martinez kick), 3:25
- Jacksonville – Sale' Key 40-yard pass from Aaron Garcia (Paul Edinger kick), 2:25
- Jacksonville – Dallas Baker 28-yard from Aaron Garcia (Paul Edinger kick), 0:07

4th quarter

- Jacksonville – Jeron Harvey 14-yard pass from Aaron Garcia (Paul Edinger kick no good)
- Orlando – Joshua Bush from 21-yard pass Nick Hill (Carlos Martinez kick), 11:22
- Orlando – Joshua Bush from 4-yard pass Nick Hill (Carlos Martinez kick), 4:31
- Jacksonville – Kirby Griffin 2-yard run (Paul Edinger kick), 1:59

Passing

- Orlando – Nick Hill: 25/36, 203 yards, 3 TD, 2 INT
- Jacksonville – Aaron Garcia: 21/20, 206 yards, 6 TD, 1 INT

Rushing

- Orlando – Nick Hill: 2 att, 13 yards
- Jacksonville – Kirby Griffin: 3 att, 5 yards, 2 TD

Receiving

- Orlando – T.T. Toliver: 8 rec, 92 yards, 1 TD
- Jacksonville – Jomo Wilson: 8 rec, 66 yards, 3 TD

The first ever edition of the "Jive on 95" ended in a loss for the Predators, who were constantly fighting penalties and turnovers throughout the night. Orlando did not lead in the game and was behind 24–7 at the half. The highlight for the Predators came on a pass from Nick Hill to T. T. Toliver. Toliver caught the ball one of the back corners of the end zone and was immediately hit, sent over the sideline walls, but still hung on to make the touchdown. Hill finished with 203 passing yards, but only 3 touchdowns.

=== Week 5: vs. Iowa Barnstormers ===
Quarter	1	2	3	4	Total
Barnstormers	7	20	7	16	50
Predators	7	13	6	14	40

at Amway Arena, Orlando, Florida

- Date: April 30
- Game time: 8:00 pm EDT
- Game attendance: 11,076
- Referee: Greg LeFils
- Recap

Game information

1st quarter

- Iowa – Tanner Varner 7-yard interception return (Jeff Glas kick), 4:15
- Orlando – Derrick Lewis 14-yard pass from Nick Hill (Carlos Martinez kick), 2:15

2nd quarter

- Iowa – Todd Blythe 12-yard pass from Ryan Vena (Jeff Glas kick), 13:38
- Orlando – T.T. Toliver 5-yard pass from Nick Hill (Glenn Gauntt pass no good), 8:17
- Orlando – Rayshawn Kizer 3-yard fumble return (Carlos Martinez kick), 7:46
- Iowa – Ryan Vena 1-yard run (Jeff Glas kick), 2:25
- Iowa – Jesse Schmidt 20-yard pass from Ryan Vena (Charles Johnson pass no good), 0:28

3rd quarter

- Iowa – Todd Blythe 11-yard pass from Ryan Vena (Jeff Glas kick), 11:10
- Orlando – Jerrian James 5-yard pass from Nick Hill (Glenn Gauntt run no good), 5:27

4th quarter

- Iowa – Ryan Vena 3-yard run (Jeff Glas kick no good), 12:06
- Orlando – Nick Hill 3-yard run (Carlos Martinez kick), 9:33
- Iowa – Jesse Schmidt 40-yard pass from Ryan Vena (Jeff Glas kick), 1:17
- Orlando – Derrick Lewis 7-yard pass from Nick Hill (Carlos Martinez kick), 0:39
- Iowa – Jeff Glas 17-yard field goal, 0:13

Passing

- Iowa – Ryan Vena: 21/32, 236 yards, 4 TD, 3 INT
- Orlando – Nick Hill: 29/35, 237 yards, 4 TD, 3 INT

Rushing

- Iowa – Ryan Vena: 7 att, 15 yards, 2 TD
- Orlando – Nick Hill: 5 att, 18 yards, 1 TD

Receiving

- Iowa – Jesse Schmidt: 7 rec, 116 yards, 2 TD
- Orlando – Derrick Lewis: 12 rec, 112 yards, 2 TD

The Predators remained winless following their loss to the Barnstormers. Down by 7 points in the 4th quarter, Marlon Moye-Moore intercepted a Barnstormer pass to set up Orlando on their own 13-yard line. On the drive following the turnover, the Predators had a 1st and goal on the 9-yard line, but were unable to score when Nick Hill threw four consecutive incomplete passes. Getting the ball back on downs, the Barnstormers found the end zone on a 40-yard pass to go up by 14 points with 1:17 left on the clock. It was a deficit the Predators could not overcome in the short amount of time, causing them to fall to 0–3. Hill finished with 237 yards and 4 passing touchdowns, but had 3 interceptions in the game. Derrick Lewis was the leading receiver with 112 yards and 2 touchdowns.

=== Week 6: at Dallas Vigilantes ===
Quarter	1	2	3	4	Total
Predators	10	13	21	26	70
Vigilantes	7	25	21	6	59

at American Airlines Center, Dallas, Texas

- Date: May 7
- Game time: 8:30 pm EDT
- Game attendance: 7,108
- Recap

Game information

1st quarter

- Dallas – Josh White 1-yard run (Mark Lewis kick good), 11:24
- Orlando – Carlos Martinez 39-yard field goal, 6:01
- Orlando – James Lynch 1-yard run (Carlos Martinez kick good), 3:02

2nd quarter

- Dallas – Josh White 1-yard run (Mark Lewis kick good), 13:00
- Orlando – Derrick Lewis 32-yard pass from Nick Hill (Carlos Martinez kick good), 10:16
- Dallas – Larry Brackins 18-yard pass from Collin Drafts (Mark Lewis kick good), 7:13
- Dallas – Safety, 5:11
- Dallas – Kenny Henderson 34-yard pass from Collin Drafts (Mark Lewis kick good), 3:59
- Orlando – James Lynch 1-yard run (Carlos Martinez run no good), 0:00
- Dallas – Fumbled PAT return, 0:00

3rd quarter

- Orlando – T.T. Toliver 24-yard pass from Nick Hill (Carlos Martinez kick good), 13:47
- Dallas – Larry Brackins 11-yard pass from Collin Drafts (Mark Lewis kick good), 8:47
- Orlando – T.T. Toliver 42-yard pass from Nick Hill (Carlos Martinez kick good), 7:27
- Dallas – Derek Lee 33-yard pass from Collin Drafts (Mark Lewis kick good), 6:29
- Orlando – Joshua Bush 6-yard pass from Nick Hill (Carlos Martinez kick good), 1:03
- Dallas – Derek Lee 44-yard pass from Collin Drafts (Mark Lewis kick good), 0:00

4th quarter

- Orlando – T.T. Toliver 14-yard pass from Nick Hill (Carlos Martinez kick no good), 12:04
- Orlando – Derrick Lewis 30-yard pass from Nick Hill (Carlos Martinez kick good), 8:05
- Orlando – T.T. Toliver 12-yard run (Carlos Martinez kick good), 3:45
- Dallas – Larry Brackins 14-yard pass from Collin Drafts (Collin Drafts pass no good), 0:55
- Orlando – Jerrian James 8-yard fumble return (Carlos Martinez kick no good), 0:00

Passing

- Orlando – Nick Hill: 21/29, 297 yards, 6 TD, 1 INT
- Dallas – Collin Drafts: 17/29, 283 yards, 6 TD, 3 INT

Rushing

- Orlando – Joshua Bush: 1 att, 25 yards
- Dallas – Kirby Griffin: 3 att, 5 yards, 2 TD

Receiving

- Orlando – T.T. Toliver: 10 rec, 149 yards, 3 TD
- Dallas – Derek Lee: 6 rec, 123 yards, 2 TD

=== Week 7: at Alabama Vipers ===
Quarter	1	2	3	4	Total
Predators	3	7	14	24	48
Vipers	3	21	0	7	31

at Von Braun Center, Huntsville, Alabama

- Date: May 15
- Game time: 8:30 pm EDT
- Game attendance: 4,007
- Recap

Game information

1st quarter

- Alabama – Brian Jackson 15-yard field goal, 10:23
- Orlando – Carlos Martinez 22-yard field goal, 5:36

2nd quarter

- Alabama – Dan Alexander 2-yard run (Brian Jackson kick), 9:14
- Orlando – T.T. Toliver 5-yard pass from Nick Hill (Carlos Martinez kick), 5:43
- Alabama – Willie Quinne 39-yard pass from Stephen Wasil (Brian Jackson kick), 3:17
- Alabama – Willie Quinne 42-yard pass from Stephen Wasil (Brian Jackson kick), 0:00

3rd quarter

- Orlando – Derrick Lewis 15-yard pass from Nick Hill (Carlos Martinez kick), 11:28
- Orlando – Jerrian James 5-yard pass from Nick Hill (Carlos Martinez kick), 2:15

4th quarter

- Alabama – Stephen Wasil 4-yard run (Brian Jackson kick), 12:13
- Orlando – James Lynch 1-yard run (Carlos Martinez kick), 8:41
- Orlando – T.T. Toliver 9-yard pass from Nick Hill (Carlos Martinez kick), 3:52
- Orlando – Carlos Martinez 8-yard field goal, 0:13
- Orlando – Robert Quiroga 1-yard fumble return (Carlos Martinez kick), 0:09

Passing

- Orlando – Nick Hill: 34/51, 273 yards, 4 TD
- Alabama – Stephen Wasil: 14/27, 200 yards, 2 TD, 2 INT

Rushing

- Orlando – Nick Hill: 4 att, 29 yards
- Alabama – Stephen Wasil: 4 att, 17 yards, 1 TD

Receiving

- Orlando – Derrick Lewis: 14 rec, 97 yards, 1 TD
- Alabama – Willie Quinne: 3 rec, 86 yards, 2 TD

Both teams put up a field goal in the 1st quarter, but the Predators trailed by a pair of touchdowns at halftime as they did the week before. However, Orlando outscored Alabama 38–7 and forced three turnovers in the 2nd half. Rayshawn Kizer had two interceptions in the game, one of which in the 4th quarter that led to a 9-yard touchdown reception by T. T. Toliver to end a lengthy drive by Orlando to pull ahead 38–31. Alabama's next drive went three-and-out, turning the ball over on downs to the Predators a yard from the end zone, but the Viper defense put up a goal-line stand and held the Preds to a field goal. The ensuing kickoff was fumbled by Alabama returner C.J. Johnson, and picked up by Orlando's Robert Quiroga at the goal line for an easy touchdown to put the Vipers away.

Nick Hill attempted 51 passes, completing 34 for 273 yards and four touchdowns, also rushing for 29 yards on four carries. Derrick Lewis caught 14 of Hill's passes for 97 yards and one touchdown as the team's leading receiver.

=== Week 8: vs. Milwaukee Iron ===
Quarter	1	2	3	4	Total
Iron	7	15	10	22	54
Predators	17	7	7	27	58

at Amway Arena, Orlando, Florida

- Date: May 21
- Game time: 7:30 pm EDT
- Game attendance: 10,333
- Recap

Game information

1st quarter

- Orlando – Derrick Lewis 14-yard pass from Nick Hill (Dion Bynum kick), 11:06
- Orlando – Dion Bynum 23-yard field goal, 8:34
- Orlando – Nick Hill 1-yard run (Carlos Martinez kick), 6:21
- Milwaukee – Damian Harrell 4-yard pass from Chris Greisen (Robert Forstrom kick), 3:10

2nd quarter

- Milwaukee – Damian Harrell 35-yard pass from Chris Greisen (Robert Forstrom kick no good), 12:36
- Orlando – Bobby Sippio 9-yard pass from Nick Hill (Carlos Martinez kick), 4:59
- Milwaukee – Tyre Young 7-yard run (Robert Forstrom kick), 0:57
- Milwaukee – Safety, 0:01

3rd quarter

- Milwaukee – Robert Forstrom 11-yard field goal, 7:50
- Orlando – T.T. Toliver 22-yard pass from Nick Hill (Carlos Martinez kick), 6:19
- Milwaukee – Anthony Jones 14-yard pass from Chris Greisen (Robert Forstrom kick), 1:03

4th quarter

- Orlando – Nick Hill 9-yard run (Carlos Martinez kick no good), 14:02
- Milwaukee – Nate Forse -yard pass from Chris Greisen (Robert Forstrom kick), 9:20
- Orlando – Derrick Lewis 3-yard pass from Nick Hill (Carlos Martinez kick), 3:12
- Milwaukee – Damian Harrell 16-yard pass from Chris Greisen (Anthony Jones pass), 1:00
- Orlando – Nick Hill 1-yard run (Carlos Martinez kick), 0:21
- Milwaukee – Anthony Jones 35-yard pass from Chris Greisen (Robert Forstrom kick), 0:13
- Orlando – Bobby Sippio 40-yard pass from Nick Hill (Carlos Martinez kick), 0:03

Passing

- Milwaukee – Chris Greisen: 27/43, 346 yards, 6 TD
- Orlando – Nick Hill: 20/32, 314 yards, 5 TD, 1 INT

Rushing

- Milwaukee – Tyre Young: 3 att, 14 yards, 1 TD
- Orlando – Nick Hill: 6 att, 21 yards, 3 TD

Receiving

- Milwaukee – Damian Harrell: 13 rec, 144 yards, 3 TD
- Orlando – T.T. Toliver: 6 rec, 122 yards, 1 TD

=== Week 9: vs. Tampa Bay Storm ===
Quarter	1	2	3	4	Total
Storm	14	21	13	14	62
Predators	10	7	6	27	50

at Amway Arena, Orlando, Florida

- Date: May 28
- Game time: 8:00 pm EDT
- Game attendance: 10,924
- Referee: Greg Lefils
- Recap

Game information

1st quarter

- Orlando – Carlos Martinez 46-yard field goal, 12:11
- Tampa Bay – Hank Edwards 23-yard pass from Brett Dietz (Garrett Rivas kick), 9:36
- Orlando – T.T. Toliver 23-yard pass from Nick Hill (Carlos Martinez kick), 6:28
- Tampa Bay – Hank Edwards 28-yard pass from Brett Dietz (Garrett Rivas kick), 5:20

2nd quarter

- Tampa Bay – DeAndrew Rubin 26-yard pass from Brett Dietz (Garrett Rivas kick), 10:17
- Orlando – Bobby Sippio 3-yard pass from Nick Hill (Carlos Martinez kick), 8:09
- Tampa Bay – Tyrone Timmons 28-yard pass from Brett Dietz (Garrett Rivas kick), 5:10
- Tampa Bay – DeAndrew Rubin 21-yard pass from Brett Dietz (Garrett Rivas kick), 1:00

3rd quarter

- Orlando – T.T. Toliver 4-yard pass from Nick Hill (Carlos Martinez kick no good), 10:24
- Tampa Bay – Hank Edwards 10-yard pass from Brett Dietz (Garrett Rivas kick), 6:32
- Tampa Bay – Terrence Royal 1-yard run (Garrett Rivas kick no good), 0:11

4th quarter

- Orlando – T.T. Toliver 26-yard pass from Nick Hill (Antoine "T.T." Toliver pass no good)
- Tampa Bay – DeAndrew Rubin 3-yard pass from Brett Dietz (Garrett Rivas kick), 11:13
- Orlando – Bobby Sippio 15-yard pass from Nick Hill (Carlos Martinez kick), 7:32
- Orlando – Bobby Sippio 26-yard pass from Nick Hill (Carlos Martinez kick), 4:45
- Orlando – Bobby Sippio 1-yard run (Carlos Martinez kick), 2:16
- Tampa Bay – Terrence Royal 1-yard run (Garrett Rivas kick), 0:34

Passing

- Tampa Bay – Brett Dietz: 22/30, 304 yards, 7 TD, 2 INT
- Orlando – Nick Hill: 31/47, 393 yards, 6 TD, 1 INT

Rushing

- Tampa Bay – Terrence Royal: 5 att, 0 yards, 2 TD
- Orlando – Nick Hill: 3 att, 4 yards

Receiving

- Tampa Bay – Hank Edwards: 7 rec, 104 yards, 3 TD
- Orlando – Bobby Sippio: 12 rec, 170 yards, 3 TD

=== Week 10: at Tulsa Talons ===
Quarter	1	2	3	4	Total
Predators	14	13	7	23	57
Talons	14	7	14	19	54

at BOK Center, Tulsa, Oklahoma

- Date: June 5
- Game time: 8:00 pm EDT
- Recap

Game information

1st quarter

- Tulsa – Odie Armstrong 3-yard run (Tony Dodson kick)
- Orlando – Joshua Bush 50-yard kickoff return (Carlos Martinez kick)
- Tulsa – Jeff Hughley 2-yard run (Tony Dodson kick), 3:46
- Orlando – Bobby Sippio 32-yard pass from Nick Hill (Carlos Martinez kick), 0:00

2nd quarter

- Orlando – Nick Hill 1-yard run (Carlos Martinez kick), 7:31
- Tulsa – Donovan Morgan 36-yard pass from Justin Allgood (Tony Dodson kick)
- Orlando – Marlon Moye-Moore 1-yard run (Carlos Martinez kick no good)

3rd quarter

- Tulsa – Donovan Morgan 8-yard pass from Justin Allgood (Tony Dodson kick)
- Orlando – T.T. Toliver 8-yard pass from Nick Hill (Carlos Martinez kick)
- Tulsa – Jeff Hughley 0-yard kickoff return (Tony Dodson kick)

4th quarter

- Orlando – Derrick Lewis 9-yard pass from Nick Hill (Carlos Martinez kick no good)
- Orlando – Derrick Lewis 6-yard pass from Nick Hill (Carlos Martinez kick)
- Tulsa – Carlese Franklin 31-yard pass from Justin Allgood (Tony Dodson kick)
- Orlando – Joshua Bush 50-yard kickoff return (Carlos Martinez kick)
- Tulsa – Donovan Morgan 22-yard pass from Justin Allgood (Tony Dodson kick no good)
- Orlando – Carlos Martinez 12-yard field goal
- Tulsa – Jeff Hughley 13-yard pass from Justin Allgood (Tony Dodson kick no good)

Passing

- Orlando – Nick Hill: 27/41, 239 yards, 4 TD, 3 INT
- Tulsa – Justin Allgood: 23/43, 220 yards, 5 TD, 1 INT

Rushing

- Orlando – Marlon Moye-Moore: 1 att, 1 yard, 1 TD
- Tulsa – Justin Allgood: 1 att, 44 yards

Receiving

- Orlando – Joshua Bush: 10 rec, 81 yards
- Tulsa – Donovan Morgan: 9 rec, 108 yards, 3 TD

=== Week 11: vs. Spokane Shock ===
Quarter	1	2	3	4	Total
Shock	13	14	13	13	53
Predators	0	24	28	0	52

at Amway Arena, Orlando, Florida

- Date: June 12
- Game time: 7:30 pm EDT
- Game attendance: 10,346
- Referee: Greg LeFills
- Recap

Game information

1st quarter

- Spokane – Clay Harrell 3-yard run (Taylor Rowan kick no good), 12:23
- Spokane – Raul Vijil 12-yard pass from Kyle Rowley (Taylor Rowan kick), 3:25

2nd quarter

- Orlando – Derrick Lewis 9-yard pass from Nick Hill (Carlos Martinez kick), 14:55
- Spokane – Huey Whittaker 1-yard run (Taylor Rowan kick), 9:28
- Orlando – James Lynch 1-yard run (Carlos Martinez kick), 6:39
- Spokane – Raul Vijil 13-yard pass from Kyle Rowley (Taylor Rowan kick), 3:55
- Orlando – Nick Hill 11-yard run (Carlos Martinez kick), 0:48
- Orlando – Carlos Martinez 25-yard field goal, 0:00

3rd quarter

- Orlando – Josh Bush 4-yard run (Carlos Martinez kick), 13:48
- Orlando – Kenny McEntyre 47-yard interception return (Carlos Martinez kick), 10:53
- Spokane – Huey Whittaker 8-yard pass from Kyle Rowley (Taylor Rowan kick), 8:18
- Orlando – Josh Bush 23-yard pass from Nick Hill (Carlos Martinez kick), 6:10
- Spokane – Huey Whittaker 12-yard pass from Kyle Rowley (Huey Whittaker pass no good), 2:05
- Orlando – Kenny McEntyre 40-yard kickoff return (Carlos Martinez kick), 0:26

4th quarter

- Spokane – Raul Vijil 1-yard pass from Kyle Rowley (Taylor Rowan pass no good), 11:51
- Spokane – Raul Vijil 6-yard pass from Kyle Rowley (Taylor Rowan kick), 0:14

Passing

- Spokane – Kyle Rowley: 28/40, 305 yards, 6 TD, 3 INT
- Orlando – Nick Hill: 18/34, 207 yards, 2 TD, 1 INT

Rushing

- Spokane – Kyle Rowley: 2 att, 7 yards
- Orlando – Nick Hill: 1 att, 11 yards, 1 TD

Receiving

- Spokane – Raul Vijil: 11 rec, 134 yards, 4 TD
- Orlando – T.T. Toliver: 5 rec, 95 yards

=== Week 12: vs. Jacksonville Sharks ===
Quarter	1	2	3	4	Total
Sharks	2	20	6	20	48
Predators	22	24	7	17	70

at Amway Arena, Orlando, Florida

- Date: June 18
- Game time: 8:00 pm EDT
- Game attendance: 14,010
- Referee: Greg Lefils
- Recap

Game information

1st quarter

- Orlando – Robert Quiroga 4-yard pass from Nick Hill (Carlos Martinez kick), 12:22
- Orlando – Safety, 11:48
- Orlando – Nick Hill 19-yard run (Carlos Martinez kick), 7:06
- Orlando – Robert Quiroga 9-yard pass from Nick Hill (Carlos Martinez kick blocked), 1:23
- Jacksonville – RaJon Myles blocked PAT return, 1:23

2nd quarter

- Jacksonville – Jomo Wilson 3-yard pass from Aaron Garcia (Paul Edinger kick no good), 12:44
- Orlando – T.T. Toliver 16-yard pass from Nick Hill (Carlos Martinez kick), 9:33
- Jacksonville – Jason Willis 5-yard pass from Aaron Garcia (Paul Edinger kick), 4:36
- Orlando – T.T. Toliver 4-yard run (Carlos Martinez kick)
- Orlando – T.T. Toliver 18-yard pass from Nick Hill (Carlos Martinez kick), 0:24
- Jacksonville – Dallas Baker 36-yard pass from Aaron Garcia (Paul Edinger kick), 0:19
- Orlando – Carlos Martinez 28-yard field goal, 0:00

3rd quarter

- Jacksonville – Jeron Harvey 47-yard pass from Aaron Garcia (Paul Edinger kick no good), 6:00
- Orlando – Jerrian James 16-yard pass from Nick Hill (Carlos Martinez kick), 1:50

4th quarter

- Jacksonville – Dallas Baker 11-yard pass from Aaron Garcia (Paul Edinger kick), 14:38
- Orlando – T.T. Toliver 19-yard pass from Nick Hill (Carlos Martinez kick), 10:12
- Jacksonville – Jeron Harvey 5-yard pass from Aaron Garcia (Paul Edinger kick), 7:08
- Orlando – Nick Hill 4-yard run (Carlos Martinez kick), 5:11
- Jacksonville – Jason Willis 12-yard pass from Aaron Garcia (Paul Edinger kick no good), 2:55
- Orlando – Carlos Martinez 10-yard field goal, 0:10

Passing

- Jacksonville – Aaron Garcia: 22/35, 290 yards, 7 TD, 1 INT
- Orlando – Nick Hill: 20/31, 232 yards, 6 TD, 1 INT

Rushing

- Jacksonville – Aaron Garcia: 1 att, 7 yards
- Orlando – Nick Hill: 6 att, 33 yards, 2 TD

Receiving

- Jacksonville – Dallas Baker: 5 rec, 91 yards, 2 TD
- Orlando – T.T. Toliver: 8 rec, 88 yards, 3 TD

=== Week 13: at Chicago Rush ===
Quarter	1	2	3	4	Total
Predators	7	21	7	7	42
Rush	16	10	17	12	55

at Allstate Arena, Rosemont, Illinois

- Date: June 26
- Game time: 8:00 pm EDT
- Game attendance: 8,120
- Referee: Bob McElwee
- Recap

Game information

1st quarter

- Orlando – Robert Quiroga 11-yard pass from Nick Hill (Carlos Martinez kick), 12:32
- Chicago – Robert Boss 21-yard pass from Russ Michna (Chris Gould kick), 10:33
- Chicago – Safety, 9:51
- Chicago – Robert Boss 24-yard pass from Russ Michna (Chris Gould kick), 5:33

2nd quarter

- Orlando – Robert Quiroga 11-yard pass from Nick Hill (Carlos Martinez kick), 14:13
- Chicago – Robert Boss 6-yard run (Chris Gould kick), 10:18
- Orlando – T.T. Toliver 27-yard pass from Nick Hill (Carlos Martinez kick), 5:50
- Orlando – T.T. Toliver 14-yard pass from Nick Hill (Carlos Martinez kick), 0:35
- Chicago – Chris Gould 23-yard field goal, 0:00

3rd quarter

- Chicago – Travis LaTendresse 6-yard pass from Russ Michna (Chris Gould kick), 11:05
- Orlando – T.T. Toliver 2-yard pass from Nick Hill (Carlos Martinez kick), 7:34
- Chicago – Chris Gould 13-yard field goal, 3:36
- Chicago – Russ Michna 3-yard run (Chris Gould kick), 0:32

4th quarter

- Orlando – Nick Hill 1-yard run (Carlos Martinez kick), 13:40
- Chicago – Samie Parker 15-yard pass from Russ Michna (Chris Gould kick), 4:33
- Chicago – Chris Gould 10-yard field goal, 0:29

Passing

- Orlando – Nick Hill: 19/27, 246 yards, 5 TD, 2 INT
- Chicago – Russ Michna: 22/35, 231 yards, 4 TD, 1 INT

Rushing

- Orlando – James Lynch: 4 att, 32 yards
- Chicago – Russ Michna: 7 att, 21 yards, 1 TD

Receiving

- Orlando – Robert Quiroga: 8 rec, 90 yards, 2 TD
- Chicago – Samie Parker: 9 rec, 97 yards, 1 TD

=== Week 14: vs. Cleveland Gladiators ===
Quarter	1	2	3	4	OT	Total
Gladiators	21	14	14	21	7	77
Predators	0	28	21	21	0	70

at Amway Arena, Orlando, Florida

- Date: July 3
- Game time: 7:30 pm EDT
- Game attendance: 10,101
- Recap

Game information

1st quarter

- Cleveland – Brent Holmes 35-yard pass from John Dutton (Matt Denny kick), 13:50
- Cleveland – Russell Monk 2-yard run (Matt Denny kick), 7:51
- Cleveland – Ben Nelson 17-yard pass from John Dutton (Matt Denny kick), 2:38

2nd quarter

- Orlando – T.T. Toliver 19-yard pass from Nick Hill (Carlos Martinez kick), 14:11
- Cleveland – Brent Holmes 5-yard pass from John Dutton (Matt Denny kick)
- Orlando – Bobby Sippio 33-yard pass from Nick Hill (Carlos Martinez kick), 9:20
- Orlando – Bobby Sippio 9-yard pass from Nick Hill (Carlos Martinez kick), 4:28
- Orlando – C.L. Grogan 40-yard fumble return (Carlos Martinez kick), 0:50
- Cleveland – Brent Holmes 23-yard pass from John Dutton (Matt Denny kick), 0:12

3rd quarter

- Cleveland – Brent Holmes 43-yard pass from John Dutton (Matt Denny kick), 11:45
- Orlando – Bobby Sippio 8-yard pass from Nick Hill (Carlos Martinez kick), 6:35
- Cleveland – Chris Johnson 26-yard pass from John Dutton (Matt Denny kick), 4:48
- Orlando – Bobby Sippio 20-yard pass from Nick Hill (Carlos Martinez kick), 3:11
- Orlando – Nick Hill 8-yard run (Carlos Martinez kick), 0:00

4th quarter

- Cleveland – Ben Nelson 13-yard pass from John Dutton (Matt Denny kick), 10:14
- Orlando – Bobby Sippio 38-yard pass from Nick Hill (Carlos Martinez kick), 9:01
- Orlando – Kenny McEntyre 23-yard interception return (Carlos Martinez kick), 7:22
- Cleveland – Chris Johnson 4-yard pass from John Dutton (Davion Mitchell kick), 2:32
- Orlando – Jerrian James 28-yard pass from Nick Hill (Carlos Martinez kick), 0:31
- Cleveland – Brent Holmes 5-yard pass from John Dutton (Matt Denny kick), 0:09

Overtime

- Cleveland – Chris Johnson 9-yard pass from John Dutton (Matt Denny kick), 8:58

Passing

- Cleveland – John Dutton: 36/53, 411 yards, 10 TD, 2 INT
- Orlando – Nick Hill: 21/35, 291 yards, 7 TD, 1 INT

Rushing

- Cleveland – Russell Monk: 3 att, 5 yards, 1 TD
- Orlando – Nick Hill: 4 att, 33 yards, 1 TD

Receiving

- Cleveland – Brent Holmes: 12 rec, 199 yards, 5 TD
- Orlando – Bobby Sippio: 9 rec, 147 yards, 5 TD

=== Week 15: vs. Alabama Vipers ===
Quarter	1	2	3	4	Total
Vipers	14	0	6	14	34
Predators	21	10	7	7	45

at Amway Arena, Orlando, Florida

- Date: July 9
- Game time: 8:00 pm EDT
- Game attendance: 10,504
- Referee: Greg Lefils
- Recap

Game information
- Alabama – C.J. Johnson 22-yard pass from Tim Hicks (Brian Jackson kick)
- Orlando – Robert Quiroga 13-yard pass from Nick Hill (Carlos Martinez kick), 10:24
- Orlando – Bobby Sippio 12-yard pass from Nick Hill (Carlos Martinez kick), 7:24
- Alabama – Dan Alexander 1-yard run (Brian Jackson kick), 2:07
- Orlando – T.T. Toliver 18-yard pass from Nick Hill (Carlos Martinez kick), 1:12

2nd quarter

- Orlando – Josh Bush 58-yard field goal return (Carlos Martinez kick), 12:42
- Orlando – Carlos Martinez 24-yard field goal, 0:33

3rd quarter

- Alabama – Michael Johnson 7-yard pass from Tim Hicks (Brian Jackson kick no good), 5:27
- Orlando – Robert Quiroga 19-yard pass from Nick Hill (Carlos Martinez kick), 1:05

4th quarter

- Alabama – Eric Crosby 23-yard interception return (Brian Jackson kick), 12:26
- Orlando – Bobby Sippio 28-yard pass from Nick Hill (Carlos Martinez kick), 8:58
- Alabama – Brandon Hall 2-yard pass from Tim Hicks (Brian Jackson kick), 6:05

Passing

- Alabama – Tim Hicks: 27/44, 267 yards, 3 TD, 3 INT
- Orlando – Nick Hill: 19/28, 206 yards, 5 TD, 1 INT

Rushing

- Alabama – Tim Hicks: 3 att, 11 yards
- Orlando – Nick Hill: 3 att, 42 yards

Receiving

- Alabama – C.J. Johnson: 18 rec, 205 yards, 1 TD
- Orlando – Robert Quiroga: 7 rec, 79 yards, 2 TD

=== Week 16: at Milwaukee Iron ===
Quarter	1	2	3	4	Total
Predators	14	6	7	14	41
Iron	6	30	7	14	57

at Bradley Center, Milwaukee, Wisconsin

- Date: July 17
- Game time: 8:00 pm EDT
- Game attendance: 6,948
- Recap

Game information

1st quarter

- Orlando – T.T. Toliver 17-yard pass from Nick Hill (Carlos Martinez kick), 11:54
- Milwaukee – Antoine Burns 43-yard pass from Chris Greisen (Robert Forstrom kick no good), 10:44
- Orlando – Robert Quiroga 4-yard pass from Nick Hill (Carlos Martinez kick), 3:26

2nd quarter

- Milwaukee – Anthony Jones 6-yard run (Robert Forstrom kick), 14:57
- Milwaukee – Damian Harrell 13-yard pass from Chris Greisen (Robert Forstrom kick), 10:57
- Orlando – Robert Quiroga 15-yard pass from Nick Hill (Carlos Martinez kick no good), 7:03
- Milwaukee – Antoine Burns 11-yard pass from Chris Greisen (Robert Forstrom kick), 3:54
- Milwaukee – Safety, 1:57
- Milwaukee – Anthony Jones 20-yard pass from Chris Greisen (Robert Forstrom kick), 0:56

3rd quarter

- Orlando – Bobby Sippio 8-yard pass from Nick Hill (Carlos Martinez kick), 11:33
- Milwaukee – Damian Harrell 27-yard pass from Chris Greisen (Robert Forstrom kick), 9:19

4th quarter

- Orlando – Nick Hill 1-yard run (Carlos Martinez kick), 14:57
- Milwaukee – Damian Harrell 18-yard pass from Chris Greisen (Robert Forstrom kick), 11:25
- Orlando – Rayshawn Kizer 47-yard interception return (Carlos Martinez kick), 2:05
- Milwaukee – Anthony Jones 10-yard pass from Chris Greisen (Robert Forstrom kick), 0:56

Passing

- Orlando – Nick Hill: 26/49, 269 yards, 4 TD, 1 INT
- Milwaukee – Chris Greisen: 20/27, 310 yards, 7 TD, 1 INT

Rushing

- Orlando – Nick Hill: 6 att, 13 yards, 1 TD
- Milwaukee – Chris Greisen: 1 att, 9 yards

Receiving

- Orlando – Robert Quiroga: 10 rec, 88 yards, 2 TD
- Milwaukee – Damian Harrell: 6 rec, 104 yards, 3 TD

=== Week 17: vs. Oklahoma City Yard Dawgz ===
Quarter	1	2	3	4	Total
Yard Dawgz	7	0	14	0	21
Predators	21	14	7	7	49

at Amway Arena, Orlando, Florida

- Date: July 24
- Game time: 7:30 pm EDT
- Game attendance: 12,343
- Referee: Greg Lefils
- Recap

Game information

1st quarter

- Oklahoma City – Timon Marshall 15-yard pass from Tommy Grady (Michael Salerno kick), 12:39
- Orlando – Robert Quiroga 8-yard pass from Nick Hill (Carlos Martinez kick), 9:22
- Orlando – Bobby Sippio 27-yard pass from Nick Hill (Carlos Martinez kick), 5:29
- Orlando – Marlon Moye-Moore 13-yard interception return (Carlos Martinez kick), 2:15

2nd quarter

- Orlando – Robert Quiroga 46-yard pass from Nick Hill (Carlos Martinez kick), 9:47
- Orlando – Bobby Sippio 30-yard pass from Nick Hill (Carlos Martinez kick), 5:41

3rd quarter

- Oklahoma City – Chad Cook 3-yard run (Michael Salerno kick), 7:45
- Orlando – Robert Quiroga 2-yard pass from Nick Hill (Carlos Martinez kick), 2:07
- Oklahoma City – Craig Fulton Jr. 35-yard pass from Xavier Lee (Michael Salerno kick), 0:00

4th quarter

- Orlando – Robert Quiroga 11-yard pass from Nick Hill (Carlos Martinez kick), 14:53

Passing

- Oklahoma City – Xavier Lee: 8/16, 155 yards, 1 TD
- Orlando – Nick Hill: 15/21, 217 yards, 6 TD

Rushing

- Oklahoma City – Chad Cook: 4 att, 23 yards, 1 TD
- Orlando – Nick Hill: 5 att, 25 yards

Receiving

- Oklahoma City – Jerel Myers: 8 rec, 115 yards
- Orlando – Robert Quiroga: 8 rec, 115 yards, 4 TD

Because the Tampa Bay Storm beat the Alabama Vipers the same night, this win over the Yard Dawgz clinched a playoff berth for the Predators.

=== Week 18: at Tampa Bay Storm ===
Quarter	1	2	3	4	Total
Predators	28	17	14	16	75
Storm	7	13	8	32	60

at St. Pete Times Forum, Tampa, Florida

- Date: July 31
- Game time: 7:30 pm EDT
- Game attendance: 17,302
- Referee: Kevin Stine
- Recap

Game information

1st quarter

- Orlando – T.T. Toliver 14-yard pass from Nick Hill (Carlos Martinez kick), 10:50
- Tampa Bay – DeAndrew Rubin 42-yard pass from Brett Dietz (Garrett Rivas kick), 8:05
- Orlando – Bobby Sippio 28-yard pass from Nick Hill (Carlos Martinez kick), 6:49
- Orlando – T.T. Toliver 17-yard pass from Nick Hill (Carlos Martinez kick), 4:31
- Orlando – T.T. Toliver 21-yard pass from Nick Hill (Carlos Martinez kick), 1:01

2nd quarter

- Tampa Bay – Terrence Royal 2-yard run (Garrett Rivas kick), 10:45
- Orlando – Bobby Sippio 4-yard pass from Nick Hill (Carlos Martinez kick), 6:58
- Orlando – T.T. Toliver 2-yard pass from Nick Hill (Carlos Martinez kick), 0:41
- Tampa Bay – DeAndrew Rubin 27-yard pass from Brett Dietz (Garrett Rivas kick no good), 0:08
- Orlando – Carlos Martinez 34-yard field goal, 0:00

3rd quarter

- Orlando – T.T. Toliver 8-yard pass from Nick Hill (Carlos Martinez kick), 9:03
- Tampa Bay – Tyrone Timmons 6-yard pass from Brett Dietz (Tyrone Timmons pass), 4:17
- Orlando – Nick Hill 4-yard run (Carlos Martinez kick), 1:44

4th quarter

- Tampa Bay – Eric Ortiz 2-yard run (Tyrone Timmons pass), 13:44
- Orlando – T.T. Toliver 25-yard pass from Nick Hill (Carlos Martinez kick), 12:32
- Tampa Bay – Hank Edwards 3-yard pass from Brett Dietz (Tyrone Timmons pass), 7:18
- Orlando – Carlos Martinez 15-yard field goal, 4:40
- Tampa Bay – DeAndrew Rubin 21-yard pass from Brett Dietz (Kelvin Kinney pass), 2:01
- Orlando – James Bryant 10-yard kickoff return (Carlos Martinez run no good), 1:08
- Tampa Bay – Hank Edwards 7-yard pass from Brett Dietz (DeAndrew Rubin pass), 0:14

Passing

- Orlando – Nick Hill: 19/26, 284 yards, 8 TD
- Tampa Bay – Brett Dietz: 32/49, 310 yards, 7 TD, 3 INT

Rushing

- Orlando – Nick Hill: 4 att, 10 yards, 1 TD
- Tampa Bay – Terrence Royal: 1 att, 2 yards, 1 TD

Receiving

- Orlando – T.T. Toliver: 9 rec, 123 yards, 6 TD
- Tampa Bay – DeAndrew Rubin: 17 rec, 245 yards, 3 TD

== Playoffs ==
=== American Conference semifinals: at Jacksonville Sharks ===
Quarter	1	2	3	4	Total
Predators	7	21	14	31	73
Sharks	13	14	13	29	69

at Jacksonville Veterans Memorial Arena, Jacksonville, Florida

- Date: August 6
- Game time: 8:00 pm EDT
- Game attendance: 10,000
- Recap

Game information

1st quarter

- Jacksonville – Dallas Baker 10-yard pass from Aaron Garcia (Paul Edinger kick), 11:38
- Orlando – Bobby Sippio 1-yard run (Carlos Martinez Kick), 5:27
- Jacksonville – Dallas Baker 17-yard pass from Aaron Garcia (Paul Edinger kick no good), 2:41

2nd quarter

- Orlando – Bobby Sippio 7-yard pass from Nick Hill (Carlos Martinez Kick), 14:56
- Jacksonville – Sale' Key 2-yard run (Paul Edinger kick), 9:15
- Orlando – T.T. Toliver 20-yard pass from Nick Hill (Carlos Martinez Kick), 5:38
- Jacksonville – Jason Willis 25-yard pass from Aaron Garcia (Paul Edinger kick), 4:41
- Orlando – Bobby Sippio 2-yard pass from Nick Hill (Carlos Martinez Kick), 0:36

3rd quarter

- Jacksonville – Henry Taylor 0-yard fumble return (Paul Edinger kick), 14:10
- Orlando – T.T. Toliver 5-yard pass from Nick Hill (Carlos Martinez Kick), 6:05
- Jacksonville – Kirby Griffin 2-yard run (Paul Edinger kick), 2:32
- Orlando – James Lynch 36-yard run (Carlos Martinez Kick), 1:00

4th quarter

- Orlando – James Lynch 2-yard run (Carlos Martinez Kick), 14:33
- Jacksonville – Jason Willis 3-yard pass from Aaron Garcia (Paul Edinger kick no good), 8:47
- Orlando – Bobby Sippio 5-yard pass from Nick Hill (Carlos Martinez Kick), 7:20
- Jacksonville – Dallas Baker 30-yard pass from Aaron Garcia (Aaron Garcia pass), 6:09
- Orlando – Bobby Sippio 3-yard run (Carlos Martinez Kick), 3:51
- Jacksonville – Sale' Key 6-yard pass from Aaron Garcia (Aaron Garcia pass), 0:57
- Orlando – Carlos Martinez 20-yard field goal
- Jacksonville – Jeron Harvey 13-yard pass from Aaron Garcia (Paul Edinger kick), 0:20
- Orlando – Bobby Sippio 16-yard pass from Nick Hill (Carlos Martinez Kick), 0:08

Passing

- Orlando – Nick Hill: 23/39, 246 yards, 6 TD
- Jacksonville – Aaron Garcia: 31/45, 346 yards, 7 TD, 1 INT

Rushing

- Orlando – James Lynch: 5 att, 84 yards, 2 TD
- Jacksonville – Sale' Key: 2 att, 4 yards, 1 TD

Receiving

- Orlando – Bobby Sippio: 9 rec, 113 yards, 4 TD
- Jacksonville – Dallas Baker: 7 rec, 91 yards, 3 TD

=== American Conference Championship: at Tampa Bay Storm ===
Quarter	1	2	3	4	Total
Predators	7	14	14	27	62
Storm	14	21	14	14	63

at St. Pete Times Forum, Tampa, Florida

- Date: August 14
- Game time: 7:30 pm EDT
- Game attendance: 10,104
- Referee: Tom McCabe
- Recap

Game information

1st quarter

- Orlando – T.T. Toliver 4-yard pass from Nick Hill (Carlos Martinez kick), 6:32
- Tampa Bay – DeAndrew Rubin 9-yard pass from Brett Dietz (Garrett Rivas kick), 4:16
- Tampa Bay – Terrence Royal 1-yard run (Garrett Rivas kick), 0:00

2nd quarter

- Orlando – T.T. Toliver 34-yard pass from Nick Hill (Carlos Martinez kick), 12:08
- Tampa Bay – DeAndrew Rubin 22-yard pass from Brett Dietz (Garrett Rivas kick), 9:43
- Orlando – Bobby Sippio 6-yard pass from Nick Hill (Carlos Martinez kick), 6:33
- Tampa Bay – Tyrone Timmons 4-yard pass from Brett Dietz (Garrett Rivas kick), 1:00
- Tampa Bay – Hank Edwards 15-yard pass from Brett Dietz (Garrett Rivas kick), 0:15

3rd quarter

- Tampa Bay – Tyrone Timmons 9-yard pass from Brett Dietz (Garrett Rivas kick), 9:43
- Orlando – T.T. Toliver 8-yard pass from Nick Hill (Carlos Martinez kick), 6:45
- Tampa Bay – Robert Powell 18-yard pass from Brett Dietz (Garrett Rivas kick), 2:11
- Orlando – T.T. Toliver 35-yard pass from Nick Hill (Carlos Martinez kick), 0:26

4th quarter

- Orlando – T.T. Toliver 30-yard pass from Nick Hill (Carlos Martinez kick), 13:22
- Tampa Bay – Terrence Royal 1-yard run (Garrett Rivas kick no good), 8:54
- Orlando – Bobby Sippio 4-yard pass from Nick Hill (Carlos Martinez kick), 6:11
- Orlando – T.T. Toliver 7-yard pass from Nick Hill (Carlos Martinez kick), 1:00
- Tampa Bay – Tyrone Timmons 7-yard pass from Brett Dietz (Terrence Royal pass), 0:49
- Orlando – T.T. Toliver 6-yard pass from Nick Hill (Carlos Martinez kick no good), 0:45

Passing

- Orlando – Nick Hill: 21/35, 265 yards, 9 TD
- Tampa Bay – Brett Dietz: 24/46, 260 yards, 7 TD, 2 INT

Rushing

- Orlando – T.T. Toliver: 1 att, 3 yards
- Tampa Bay – Terrence Royal: 7 att, 6 yards, 2 TD

Receiving

- Orlando – T.T. Toliver: 11 rec, 165 yards, 7 TD
- Tampa Bay – DeAndrew Rubin: 10 rec, 116 yards, 2 TD
