= Antonio Burks =

Antonio Burks may refer to:

- Antonio Burks (basketball, born 1980), American former NBA player
- Antonio Burks (basketball, born 1982), American former player in Japan and Canada
