= Jean-Paul Afif =

Lebanese-American basketball player (born 1980)

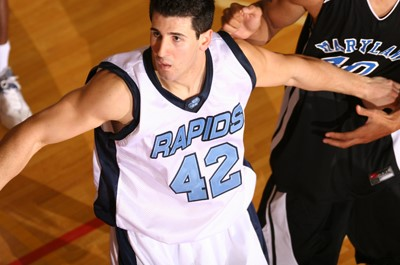
- Afif with the Buffalo Rapids in 2005

Personal information
- Born: March 30, 1980 (age 46) Los Angeles, California, US
- Listed height: 6 ft 7 in (2.01 m)
- Listed weight: 226 lb (103 kg)

Career information
- High school: Temecula Valley (1994–1998)
- College: St. Catharine College (1998–1999); Loyola Marymount (1999–2000); University of North Dakota (2000–2001); Loyola Marymount (2001–2002)
- NBA draft: 2002: undrafted
- Playing career: 2002–2007
- Position: Forward
- Coaching career: 2007–2008

Career history

Playing
- 2002: Mobile Revelers
- 2003: Café Najjar (LBL)
- 2004–2005: Fortitudo Bologna
- 2005–2006: Buffalo Rapids
- 2006–2007: Texas Tycoons

Coaching
- 2007–2008: Texas Tycoons
- 2008: Dallas Defenders

Career highlights
- As coach: ABA All-Star Game coach (2008)

Career coaching record
- ABA: 21–3 (.875)
- PBL: 7–3 (.700)

Jean-Paul Afif (born March 30, 1980) is an American-Lebanese former professional basketball player.

Afif previously played college basketball in NCAA Division I for Loyola Marymount University. He went on to play professionally in multiple leagues, and coached the Texas Tycoons and Dallas Defenders.

== History ==
=== High school career ===
Jean-Paul Simon Afif was born on March 30, 1980, in Los Angeles, and attended Temecula Valley High School in Temecula, California.

=== Collegiate career ===
Afif played basketball during his sophomore season at Loyola Marymount University in 1999–00 after transferring from St. Catharine College. His basketball scholarship was revoked the following season by new coach Steve Aggers, and Afif brought suit against the school.

After transferring to University of North Dakota while litigation was pending, Afif returned to Loyola Marymount to complete his bachelor's degree in business in 2002.

=== Professional career ===
After going undrafted in 2002, Afif was signed by the Sacramento Kings of the National Basketball Association but released before the 2002–03 NBA season started. He was then selected with the 101st overall pick in the 2002 National Basketball Development League draft by the Mobile Revelers.

Afif played for Café Najjar of the Lebanese Basketball League in 2003. He kept playing internationally, signing with Fortitudo Bologna for their 2004–05 season.

He played the 2005–06 ABA season with the expansion Buffalo Rapids. Afif then finished his playing career with the Texas Tycoons for the 2006–07 ABA season, where they reached the ABA championship game.

=== Coaching career ===
Afif was named head coach of the Texas Tycoons for the 2007–08 ABA season, leading them to a 21–3 record. In honor of his outstanding record during the regular season, he was selected as head coach of the West All-Stars in the 2008 ABA All-Star Game.

He took over coaching for the struggling Dallas Defenders franchise in 2008, and led that team to a Premier Basketball League playoff appearance.

Afif was then offered the head coaching job for the expansion Buffalo Dragons of the Premier Basketball League, but he instead opted to retire.

== Personal life ==
His brother is former football player Patrick Afif. He has been married to his wife Krista since 2008, and they have eight children.

Afif is a practicing Catholic, and was executive producer for the 2020 anti-abortion film Roe vs. Wade.

He has been a financial advisor for Morgan Stanley since 2023.
