= 2008 ABA All-Star Game =

Exhibition basketball game

East	West
161	140
- Date: March 21–22, 2008
- Venue: Barre Auditorium, Barre, Vermont
- MVP: Anthony Anderson
- Attendance: 1,500

The 2008 American Basketball Association All-Star Game was held at the 1,856 seat Barre Auditorium in Barre, Vermont on March 21–22, 2008, where East defeated West in style, 161–140 in front of 1,500 basketball fans. Anthony Anderson of the Manchester Millrats won the MVP award. Senegalese player Issa Konare and Chinese Sun Yue were the only foreigners of the All-Star Game.

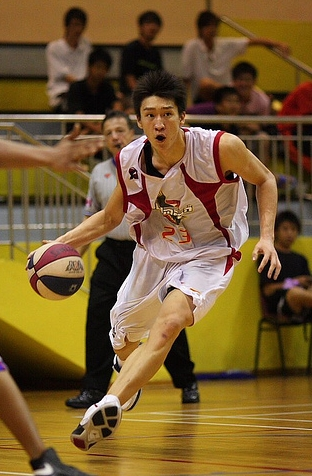
Chinese international Sun Yue was selected for the West All-Stars.

== The 2008 ABA All-Star Game events ==
=== The Three-Point contest ===
The night before the All-Star Game on March, in the opening event of the 2008 ABA All-Star Weekend, Robin Kennedy of the Orange County Gladiators, an And1 Tour veteran, nosed out guard Sean Dixon of the Atlanta Vision to win the Simply Subs ABA Three-Point crown. Antonio Burks, Kenny Wright also participated in the contest but failed to qualify to the final.

=== The Slam-Dunk contest ===
Chris Cayole of the Vermont Frost Heaves playing in front of his home crowd, won the M&M Beverage Centers Slam-Dunk title, thanks to a 360-degree windmill jam which ultimately earned him the dunk title over Cardell Butler of the San Diego Wildcats and Mario Kinsey of the Texas Tycoons at the Barre Auditorium on Friday, March 21.

== All-Star teams ==
=== Rosters ===
East All-Stars
Pos.	Player	Team	Appearance
Starters
G	Anthony Anderson	Manchester Millrats	
F	Samuel Audet-Sow	Quebec Kebekwa	
G	Tommy Mitchell	Halifax Rainmen	
F	(Senegal) Issa Konare	Vermont Frost Heaves	
F	Antonio Burks	Vermont Frost Heaves	
Reserves
G	Joey Britto	Jersey Express	
F	P.J. Young	Manchester Millrats	
G	Charles Fortier (basketball)	Quebec Kebekwa	
F	Cordell Jeanty	Montreal Royal	
Head coach: Will Voigt (Vermont Frost Heaves)

West All-Stars
Pos.	Player	Team	Appearance
Starters
G	Mario Kinsey	Texas Tycoons	
C	Randall Williams	Texas Tycoons	
F	Jerome Habel	San Diego Wildcats	
F	Cardell Butler	San Diego Wildcats	
G	(China) Sun Yue	(China) Beijing Aoshen Olympian	
Reserves
G	Jamel Staten	Beijing Aoshen Olympian	
G	Kenny Wright	Long Beach Breakers	
G	Chancey Ephraim	West Texas Whirlwinds	
G	Robin Kennedy	Orange County Gladiators	
G	Sean Dixon	Atlanta Vision	
G	B.J. Puckett	Atlanta Vision	
Head coach: Jean-Paul Afif (Texas Tycoons)

== See also ==
- 2006 ABA All-Star Game
- 2007 ABA All-Star Game
- 2011 ABA All-Star Game
