= Cardell Butler =

American basketball player (born 1981)

Personal information
- Nickname: Ballaholic
- Nationality: (United States) American
- Born: April 28, 1981 (age 45) San Francisco, California, United States
- Height: 6 ft 4 in (1.93 m)
- Weight: 200 lb (91 kg)

Sport
- Sport: Basketball
- Event: Streetball
- College team: College of Southern Idaho (2000–2002); Utah State (2002–2004)
- Team: AND1 Mixtape Tour (2004–06); San Diego Wildcats
- Turned pro: 2004

Cardell Anthony Butler (born April 28, 1981, in San Francisco, California), also known as "Ballaholic," is an American streetball player. He is known for his appearances on the AND1 Mixtape Tour shows, which aired on ESPN. In conventional basketball, Butler has also played for the San Diego Wildcats of the American Basketball Association. He is 6-foot 4-inches tall, wears size 19 shoes, and plays the guard position. Butler is known for his aggressive scoring ability. When he was 15, Butler received his nickname, "Ballaholic", because he earned a reputation on the basketball court of always shooting the ball whenever he gained possession of it. Butler now plays for the San Francisco Rumble of the American Basketball Association.

== College career ==
Butler played college basketball at Utah State. While in his senior year at Utah State they were in and out of the AP top 25 College Basketball Rankings. Utah State finished the regular season with a record of 25 wins against only 2 losses, but lost to Cal St. Northridge in the Big West Conference tournament semifinal game, ending their chance at an automatic bid into the NCAA tournament. Utah State was then denied an at large bid into the tournament, and became the only team to ever finish the season in the AP top 25 rankings and not be selected into the NCAA tournament. University of the Pacific, the team that went on to represent the Big West Conference, went on to upset two teams and make it into the Sweet 16. While at Utah State, Butler was known for his dunking ability.

== ABA career ==
Butler started playing semi-professionally with the San Diego Wildcats in 2004 in the ABA League and he was chosen for the 2007 and 2008 ABA All Star-Games.
