= Augustus Parrish =

American football player (born 1987)

Profile
- Position: Offensive tackle

Personal information
- Born: March 19, 1987 (age 39); Washington, D.C., U.S.
- Listed height: 6 ft 4 in (1.93 m)
- Listed weight: 303 lb (137 kg)

Career information
- College: Kent State
- NFL draft: 2009: undrafted

Career history
- New Orleans Saints (2009)*; Cincinnati Bengals (2009); Orlando Predators (2010)
- * Offseason or practice squad member only

Awards and highlights
- 2× Second-team All-MAC (2007–2008)

Augustus "Gus" Parrish (born March 19, 1987) is an American former football offensive tackle. He was signed by the New Orleans Saints as an undrafted free agent in 2009. He played college football at Kent State University. He is now the head coach at Bowie High School (Maryland).

== Professional career ==
=== New Orleans Saints ===
After going undrafted in the 2009 NFL draft, Parrish was signed by the New Orleans Saints as an undrafted free agent on May 6. However, the team waived him on June 4.

=== Cincinnati Bengals ===
Parrish was signed by the Cincinnati Bengals on August 3, 2009. His attempt to make the Bengals' roster was chronicled on the HBO series Hard Knocks: Training Camp with the Cincinnati Bengals.
