= Patrick Afif =

American gridiron football player (born 1983)

No. 77,75,63,72
- Position: Offensive tackle

Personal information
- Born: March 20, 1983 (age 43); Los Angeles, California, U.S.
- Listed height: 6 ft 7 in (2.01 m)
- Listed weight: 320 lb (145 kg)

Career information
- High school: Temecula Valley (Temecula, California)
- College: Washington State
- NFL draft: 2005: undrafted

Career history
- Washington Commanders (2006); RioGrande Dorados (2006); San Jose SaberCats (2007); Arizona Rattlers (2008); Toronto Argonauts (2009)*; New York Sentinels (2009)*; Orlando Predators (2010); Edmonton Eskimos (2010); Sacramento Mountain Lions (2011-2012); New Orleans VooDoo (2012); Spokane Shock (2013–2015)
- * Offseason or practice squad member only

Awards and highlights
- ArenaBowl champion (2007); Second-team All-Arena (2015)

Career AFL statistics
- Receptions: 5
- Receiving yards: 31
- Total tackles: 3
- Stats at ArenaFan.com
- Stats at CFL.ca (archive)

Patrick Simon Afif (born March 20, 1983) is an American former football offensive tackle. He was signed by the Washington Commanders as a street free agent in 2006. He played college football at Washington State. Afif was also a member of the San Jose SaberCats, Arizona Rattlers, Toronto Argonauts, Orlando Predators, Edmonton Eskimos, Sacramento Mountain Lions, New Orleans VooDoo and Spokane Shock.

His brother is former basketball player Jean-Paul Afif.

== Professional career ==
Afif was signed by the Florida Tuskers of the United Football League on September 9, 2009.
