= 2010 Jacksonville Sharks season =

Arena Football League team season

- Head coach: Les Moss
- Home stadium: Jacksonville Veterans Memorial Arena

Results
- Record: 12–4
- Division place: 1st AC South
- Playoffs: Lost Conference semifinals (Predators) 69–73

The 2010 Jacksonville Sharks season was the inaugural season for the franchise in the Arena Football League. The team was coached by Les Moss and played their home games at Jacksonville Veterans Memorial Arena. The Sharks put together a 12–4 record, winning the South division and was also the top team in the American Conference. However, the Sharks lost a back-and-forth game at home to the Orlando Predators in the opening playoff round by a score of 69–73.

== Standings ==
South Division
Team	W	L	PCT	PF	PA	DIV	CON	Home	Away
z-Jacksonville Sharks	12	4	.750	893	806	4–2	8–2	7–1	5–3
x-Tampa Bay Storm	11	5	.687	926	812	3–3	8–4	6–2	5–3
x-Orlando Predators	8	8	.500	865	845	4–2	7–3	4–4	4–4
Alabama Vipers	7	9	0.437	812	860	1–5	7–9	5–3	2–6

z - Clinched division and conference's best record
x - Clinched playoff berth

== Regular season schedule ==
The first game in franchise history for the Sharks was on April 3 as they visited the Yard Dawgz. Their first home game for the franchise is on April 16 during Week 3 against the Predators. The conclusion of the regular season was at home in Week 18 against the Shock on July 30.

Week	Day	Date	Kickoff	Opponent	Results		Location	Report
Week	Day	Date	Kickoff	Opponent	Score	Record	Location	Report
1	Saturday	April 3	8:05 pm	at Oklahoma City Yard Dawgz	W 54–38	1–0	Cox Convention Center	
2	Friday	April 9	8:30 pm	at Alabama Vipers	L 49–63	1–1	Von Braun Center	
3	Friday	April 16	8:05 pm	Orlando Predators	W 57–31	2–1	Jacksonville Veterans Memorial Arena	
4	Bye							
5	Saturday	May 1	7:05 pm	Tulsa Talons	W 62–60	3–1	Jacksonville Veterans Memorial Arena	
6	Friday	May 7	8:00 pm	at Tampa Bay Storm	W 46–43	4–1	St. Pete Times Forum	
7	Friday	May 14	7:35 pm	Dallas Vigilantes	W 70–49	5–1	Jacksonville Veterans Memorial Arena	
8	Saturday	May 22	7:05 pm	Cleveland Gladiators	W 46–44	6–1	Jacksonville Veterans Memorial Arena	
9	Saturday	May 29	10:00 pm	at Spokane Shock	L 57–67	6–2	Spokane Veterans Memorial Arena	
10	Friday	June 4	8:00 pm	at Chicago Rush	W 64–56	7–2	Allstate Arena	
11	Bye							
12	Friday	June 18	8:00 pm	at Orlando Predators	L 48–70	7–3	Amway Arena	
13	Saturday	June 26	7:05 pm	Arizona Rattlers	L 50–66	7–4	Jacksonville Veterans Memorial Arena	
14	Saturday	July 3	7:05 pm	Alabama Vipers	W 62–47	8–4	Jacksonville Veterans Memorial Arena	
15	Saturday	July 10	9:05 pm	at Utah Blaze	W 67–56	9–4	Maverik Center	
16	Saturday	July 17	7:05 pm	Tampa Bay Storm	W 49–47	10–4	Jacksonville Veterans Memorial Arena	
17	Saturday	July 24	8:05 pm	at Bossier–Shreveport Battle Wings	W 48–20	11–4	CenturyTel Center	
18	Friday	July 30	7:35 pm	Spokane Shock	W 64–49	12–4	Jacksonville Veterans Memorial Arena	

All times are EDT

== Playoff schedule ==
Round	Day	Date	Kickoff	Opponent	Score	Location	Report
AC Semifinals	Friday	August 6	8:00 pm	Orlando Predators	L 69–73	Jacksonville Veterans Memorial Arena	

All times are EDT

== Regular season ==
=== Week 1: at Oklahoma City Yard Dawgz ===
Quarter	1	2	3	4	Total
Sharks	6	7	21	20	54
Yard Dawgz	7	3	7	21	38

at Cox Convention Center, Oklahoma City, Oklahoma

- Date: April 3
- Game time: 8:05 pm EDT
- Game attendance: 5,542
- Referee: Chris Snead
- Recap

Game information

1st quarter

- Oklahoma City – Al Hunt 5-yard pass from Tommy Grady (AJ Haglund kick), 9:47
- Jacksonville – Jomo Wilson 40-yard pass from Aaron Garcia (Paul Edinger kick no good), 8:31

2nd quarter

- Jacksonville – Jomo Wilson 2-yard run (Paul Edinger kick), 5:53
- Oklahoma City – AJ Haglund 10-yard field goal, 0:08

3rd quarter

- Jacksonville – Jason Willis 21-yard pass from Aaron Garcia (Paul Edinger kick), 12:38
- Oklahoma City – Timon Marshall 24-yard pass from Tommy Grady (AJ Haglund kick), 8:50
- Jacksonville – Jeron Harvey 36-yard pass from Aaron Garcia (Paul Edinger kick), 6:58
- Jacksonville – Jason Willis 22-yard pass from Aaron Garcia (Paul Edinger kick), 3:08

4th quarter

- Oklahoma City – Timon Marshall 9-yard pass from Tommy Grady (AJ Haglund kick), 13:41
- Jacksonville – Jeron Harvey 5-yard pass from Aaron Garcia (Paul Edinger kick), 10:08
- Jacksonville – Jason Perry 0-yard kickoff return (Paul Edinger kick), 8:11
- Oklahoma City – Anthony Hines 10-yard pass from Tommy Grady (AJ Haglund pass no good), 6:39
- Oklahoma City – David Hyland 54-yard interception return (Freddie Rollins pass), 4:01
- Jacksonville – Jeron Harvey 14-yard kickoff return (Kirby Griffin pass no good), 3:27

Passing

- Jacksonville – Aaron Garcia: 11/16, 154 yards, 5 TD, 1 INT
- Oklahoma City – Tommy Grady: 22/34, 219 yards, 4 TD, 1 INT

Rushing

- Jacksonville – Kirby Griffin: 4 att, 17 yards
- Oklahoma City – Freddie Rollins: 3 att, 0 yards

Receiving

- Jacksonville – Jeron Harvey: 5 rec, 74 yards, 2 TD
- Oklahoma City – Timon Marshall: 6 rec, 63 yards, 2 TD

The first game in franchise history for the Sharks was a low-scoring affair in the 1st half, with the Sharks holding a slight lead at 13–10 at halftime. The Sharks pulled away in the 3rd quarter with three touchdown passes. Their lead fell to only 10 points with just over 4 minutes to play, but the Sharks' special teams returned an onside kick for a touchdown to seal their first-ever win. The Sharks only put up 225 yards of total offense, while quarterback Aaron Garcia, who had most recently played for the New York Dragons in 2008, completed 11 passes on 16 attempts for 154 yards, but 5 of those passes were touchdowns.

=== Week 2: at Alabama Vipers ===
Quarter	1	2	3	4	Total
Sharks	7	21	7	14	49
Vipers	7	14	14	28	63

at Von Braun Center, Huntsville, Alabama

- Date: April 9
- Game time: 8:30 pm EDT
- Game attendance: 4,007
- Recap

Game information

1st quarter

- Alabama – Dan Alexander 2-yard run (Brian Jackson kick), 11:12
- Jacksonville – Jason Willis 29-yard pass from Aaron Garcia (Paul Edinger kick), 9:19

2nd quarter

- Alabama – Dan Alexander 4-yard run (Brian Jackson kick), 13:19
- Jacksonville – Jason Willis 3-yard pass from Aaron Garcia (Paul Edinger kick), 11:00
- Alabama – Dan Alexander 3-yard run (Brian Jackson kick), 4:57
- Jacksonville – Jomo Wilson 50-yard kickoff return (Paul Edinger kick), 4:43
- Jacksonville – Sale' Key 6-yard pass from Aaron Garcia (Paul Edinger kick), 0:00

3rd quarter

- Jacksonville – Kirby Griffin 2-yard run (Paul Edinger kick), 10:50
- Alabama – C.J. Johnson 27-yard pass from Kevin Eakin (Brian Jackson kick), 9:41
- Alabama – C.J. Johnson 16-yard pass from Kevin Eakin (Brian Jackson kick), 2:40

4th quarter

- Alabama – Larry Shipp 10-yard pass from Kevin Eakin (Brian Jackson kick), 13:29
- Alabama – Ahmad Hawkins 40-yard interception return (Brian Jackson kick), 12:45
- Alabama – Dan Alexander 7-yard run (Brian Jackson kick), 5:53
- Jacksonville – James Clark 7-yard pass from Aaron Garcia (Paul Edinger kick), 3:43
- Alabama – Larry Shipp 12-yard pass from Kevin Eakin (Brian Jackson kick), 1:26
- Jacksonville – Jomo Wilson 13-yard pass from Aaron Garcia (Paul Edinger kick), 0:49

Passing

- Jacksonville – Aaron Garcia: 18/29, 186 yards, 5 TD, 2 INT
- Alabama – Kevin Eakin: 22/41, 244 yards, 4 TD

Rushing

- Jacksonville – Kirby Griffin: 2 att, 4 yards, 1 TD
- Alabama – Dan Alexander: 13 att, 40 yards, 4 TD

Receiving

- Jacksonville – Jason Willis: 3 rec, 54 yards, 2 TD
- Alabama – C.J. Johnson: 6 rec, 96 yards, 2 TD

The Sharks led by a touchdown at halftime, but gave up 42 points to the Vipers in the 2nd half, losing the game 63–49. After scoring the 2nd half's first touchdown, the Sharks went nearly 20 minutes without another touchdown, allowing the Vipers to take a 21-point lead in the meantime. It was a deficit too great for the Sharks to overcome, despite scoring a touchdown on their last two drives of the game. Quarterback Aaron Garcia threw for 186 yards, with 5 touchdowns, but 2 interceptions. The Sharks had only 190 net yards in the game.

=== Week 3: vs. Orlando Predators ===
Quarter	1	2	3	4	Total
Predators	7	0	10	14	31
Sharks	14	10	21	12	57

at Jacksonville Veterans Memorial Arena, Jacksonville, Florida

- Date: April 16
- Game time: 8:05 pm EDT
- Recap

Game information

1st quarter

- Jacksonville – Jomo Wilson 3-yard pass from Aaron Garcia (Paul Edinger kick), 7:32
- Orlando – T.T. Toliver 9-yard pass from Nick Hill (Carlos Martinez kick), 2:24
- Jacksonville – Jomo Wilson 7-yard pass from Aaron Garcia (Paul Edinger kick), 0:59

2nd quarter

- Jacksonville – Kirby Griffin 3-yard run (Paul Edinger kick), 3:06
- Jacksonville – Paul Edinger 25-yard field goal, 0:07

3rd quarter

- Orlando – Carlos Martinez 29-yard field goal
- Jacksonville – Jomo Wilson 33-yard pass from Aaron Garcia (Paul Edinger kick), 8:36
- Orlando – Marlon Moye-Moore 4-yard run (Carlos Martinez kick), 3:25
- Jacksonville – Sale' Key 40-yard pass from Aaron Garcia (Paul Edinger kick), 2:25
- Jacksonville – Dallas Baker 28-yard from Aaron Garcia (Paul Edinger kick), 0:07

4th quarter

- Jacksonville – Jeron Harvey 14-yard pass from Aaron Garcia (Paul Edinger kick no good)
- Orlando – Joshua Bush from 21-yard pass Nick Hill (Carlos Martinez kick), 11:22
- Orlando – Joshua Bush from 4-yard pass Nick Hill (Carlos Martinez kick), 4:31
- Jacksonville – Kirby Griffin 2-yard run (Paul Edinger kick), 1:59

Passing

- Orlando – Nick Hill: 25/36, 203 yards, 3 TD, 2 INT
- Jacksonville – Aaron Garcia: 21/20, 206 yards, 6 TD, 1 INT

Rushing

- Orlando – Nick Hill: 2 att, 13 yards
- Jacksonville – Kirby Griffin: 3 att, 5 yards, 2 TD

Receiving

- Orlando – T.T. Toliver: 8 rec, 92 yards, 1 TD
- Jacksonville – Jomo Wilson: 8 rec, 66 yards, 3 TD

The Sharks took on one of their in-state opponents for the first time ever in what was called the "Jive on 95," similar to the name of the Predators' in-state rivalry with the Tampa Bay Storm, The War on I-4. The Sharks never trailed in the game, holding a 24–7 lead at halftime. After a Predators field goal in the 3rd quarter, Jacksonville scored 27 of the next 34 points of the game. Aaron Garcia completed 21 of 29 passes for 206 yards and 6 touchdowns. With the win, the Sharks improved to 2–1.

=== Week 5: vs. Tulsa Talons ===
Quarter	1	2	3	4	Total
Talons	7	19	14	20	60
Sharks	14	14	7	27	62

at Jacksonville Veterans Memorial Arena, Jacksonville, Florida

- Date: May 1
- Game time: 7:05 pm EDT
- Recap

Game information

1st quarter

- Jacksonville – Jomo Wilson 32-yard pass from Aaron Garcia (Patrick Bugg kick), 14:15
- Tulsa – Donovan Morgan 12-yard pass from Justin Allgood (Tony Dodson kick), 8:43
- Jacksonville – Dallas Baker 4-yard pass from Aaron Garcia (Patrick Bugg kick), 1:47

2nd quarter

- Tulsa – Donovan Morgan 9-yard pass from Justin Allgood (Tony Dodson kick), 12:30
- Jacksonville – Sale' Key 3-yard pass from Aaron Garcia (Patrick Bugg kick), 9:48
- Tulsa – Jeff Hughley 21v pass from Justin Allgood (Tony Dodson kick), 6:32
- Jacksonville – Dallas Baker 15-yard pass from Aaron Garcia (Patrick Bugg kick), 3:50
- Tulsa – Jeff Hughley 4-yard pass from Justin Allgood (Tony Dodson kick no good), 0:01

3rd quarter

- Tulsa – Jeff Hughley 10-yard pass from Justin Allgood (Tony Dodson kick), 12:49
- Jacksonville – Sale' Key 26-yard pass from Aaron Garcia (Patrick Bugg kick), 7:39
- Tulsa – Odie Armstrong 1-yard run (Tony Dodson kick), 4:52

4th quarter

- Jacksonville – Justin Parrish 29-yard fumble return (Patrick Bugg kick), 13:59
- Tulsa – Donovan Morgan 9-yard pass from Justin Allgood (Tony Dodson kick), 10:42
- Jacksonville – Dallas Baker 25-yard pass from Aaron Garcia (Patrick Bugg kick no good) 6:30
- Tulsa – Jeff Hughley 50-yard kickoff return (Jeff Hughley pass no good), 7:22
- Jacksonville – Jomo Wilson 3-yard run (Bernard Morris run), 0:56
- Tulsa – Jeff Hughley 4-yard pass from Justin Allgood (Tony Dodson kick), 0:08
- Jacksonville – Dallas Baker 9-yard pass from Aaron Garcia (Bernard Morris run no good), 0:00

Passing

- Tulsa – Justin Allgood: 23/36, 253 yards, 7 TD
- Jacksonville – Aaron Garcia: 24/33, 294 yards, 7 TD, 2 INT

Rushing

- Tulsa – Odie Armstrong: 6 att, 14 yards, 1 TD
- Jacksonville – Jomo Wilson: 2 att, 3 yards, 1 TD

Receiving

- Tulsa – Donovan Morgan: 9 rec, 131 yards, 3 TD
- Jacksonville – Dallas Baker: 8 rec, 105 yards, 4 TD

Neither team made a defensive stop in the 1st half, but the Sharks led 28–26 at the break thanks to a pair of missed extra points by the Talons. The scoring exploded in the 4th quarter, as the teams combined for 47 points. With 56 seconds left in the final quarter, the Talons used up all but 8 seconds left to pull ahead with a 4-yard touchdown pass, making the score 60–56 in favor of Tulsa. After receiving the ensuing kickoff, the Sharks had time for one more play. Aaron Garcia's pass to the end zone was nearly caught for a touchdown, but fell incomplete. This should have ended the game, however a defensive pass interference penalty was called on the Talons, meaning the Sharks would be given another shot on an untimed down. Jacksonville capitalized on the second chance with a 9-yard pass from Garcia caught by Dallas Baker for a touchdown, giving the Sharks their third win of the season.

Garcia completed 24 of 33 passes for 294 yards, 7 touchdowns, and 2 interceptions. Baker finished with 105 receiving yards on 8 catches, with 4 touchdowns. Jomo Wilson caught for 106 yards on the night, with just a single touchdown.

=== Week 6: at Tampa Bay Storm ===
Quarter	1	2	3	4	Total
Sharks	12	13	7	14	46
Storm	7	17	7	12	43

at St. Pete Times Forum, Tampa, Florida

- Date: May 7
- Game time: 8:00 pm EDT
- Game attendance: 14,201
- Referee: Kevin Stine
- Recap

Game information

1st quarter

- Tampa Bay – Hank Edwards 20-yard pass from Brett Dietz (Garrett Rivas kick), 12:17
- Jacksonville – Kirby Griffin 2-yard run (Mossimo Sbaccia kick no good), 8:24
- Jacksonville – Sale' Key 22-yard pass from Aaron Garcia (Mossimo Sbaccia kick no good), 4:51

2nd quarter

- Tampa Bay – Terrence Royal 2-yard run (Garrett Rivas kick), 14:20
- Jacksonville – Jomo Wilson 18-yard pass from Aaron Garcia (Mossimo Sbaccia kick), 11:13
- Tampa Bay – Tyrone Timmons 3-yard pass from Brett Dietz (Garrett Rivas kick), 7:40
- Jacksonville – Jomo Wilson 1-yard run (Mossimo Sbaccia kick blocked), 1:59
- Tampa Bay – Garrett Rivas 19-yard field goal, 0:00

3rd quarter

- Tampa Bay – DeAndrew Rubin 32-yard pass from Brett Dietz (Garrett Rivas kick), 11:13
- Jacksonville – Jomo Wilson 28-yard pass from Aaron Garcia (Mossimo Sbaccia kick), 9:27

4th quarter

- Tampa Bay – DeAndrew Rubin 29-yard pass from Brett Dietz (Garrett Rivas kick no good), 12:36
- Jacksonville – Jomo Wilson 10-yard pass from Aaron Garcia (Aaron Garcia pass no good)
- Tampa Bay – Tyrone Timmons 11-yard pass from Brett Dietz (Drew Weatherford run no good), 1:00
- Jacksonville – Sale' Key 4-yard pass from Aaron Garcia (Bernard Morris run), 0:36

Passing

- Jacksonville – Aaron Garcia: 27/44, 342 yards, 5 TD, 2 INT
- Tampa Bay – Brett Dietz: 22/35, 293 yards, 5 TD, 2 INT

Rushing

- Jacksonville – Jomo Wilson: 1 att, 1 yard, 1 TD
- Tampa Bay – Terrence Royal: 3 att, 1 yard, 1 TD

Receiving

- Jacksonville – Jomo Wilson: 10 rec, 148 yards, 3 TD
- Tampa Bay – DeAndrew Rubin: 8 rec, 147 yards, 2 TD

In a game that saw neither team lead by more than 6 points, the Sharks came out on top by a final score of 46–43. Tampa Bay took a 43–38 lead with just over a minute to play in the 4th quarter. Jacksonville answered with a touchdown drive that ended with a 3-yard touchdown reception by Sale' Key. The Storm's hopes of a last-second score vanished after a fumble on their ensuing drive that was picked up by the Sharks' Micheaux Robinson. Jacksonville then ran out the clock to seal their fourth win. Aaron Garcia threw for 342 yards and 5 touchdowns with 2 interceptions. Jomo Wilson led all receivers with 148 yards on 10 catches for 3 touchdowns, and also ran for a touchdown in the game.

=== Week 7: vs. Dallas Vigilantes ===
Quarter	1	2	3	4	Total
Vigilantes	0	14	21	14	49
Sharks	13	23	7	27	70

at Jacksonville Veterans Memorial Arena, Jacksonville, Florida

- Date: May 14
- Game time: 7:35 pm EDT
- Game attendance: 10,052
- Recap

Game information

1st quarter

- Jacksonville – Dallas Baker 19-yard pass from Aaron Garcia (Mossimo Sbaccia kick)
- Jacksonville – Jomo Wilson 1-yard pass from Aaron Garcia (Mossimo Sbaccia kick no good)

2nd quarter

- Dallas – Josh White 12-yard pass from Collin Drafts (Mark Lewis kick)
- Jacksonville – Jomo Wilson 11-yard pass from Aaron Garcia (Mossimo Sbaccia kick)
- Jacksonville – Jeron Harvey 16-yard pass from Aaron Garcia (Mossimo Sbaccia kick)
- Jacksonville – Safety, 1:12
- Jacksonville – Jeron Harvey 15-yard pass from Aaron Garcia (Mossimo Sbaccia kick), 0:27
- Dallas – Larry Brackins 19-yard pass from Collin Drafts (Mark Lewis kick), 0:16

3rd quarter

- Dallas – Larry Brackins 5-yard pass from Collin Drafts (Mark Lewis kick), 12:07
- Dallas – Larry Brackins 22-yard pass from Collin Drafts (Mark Lewis kick), 6:00
- Jacksonville – Jomo Wilson 33-yard pass from Aaron Garcia (Mossimo Sbaccia kick), 4:34
- Dallas – Kenny Henderson 40-yard pass from Collin Drafts (Mark Lewis kick), 1:18

4th quarter

- Jacksonville – Jomo Wilson 22-yard pass from Aaron Garcia (Mossimo Sbaccia kick no good), 14:10
- Dallas – Larry Brackins 7-yard pass from Collin Drafts (Mark Lewis kick no good), 7:35
- Jacksonville – Dallas Baker 14-yard pass from Aaron Garcia (Mossimo Sbaccia kick), 6:37
- Jacksonville – Justin Parrish 1-yard fumble return (Mossimo Sbaccia kick), 5:32
- Dallas – Larry Brackins 13-yard pass from Collin Drafts (Kenny Henderson run), 1:15
- Jacksonville – Kirby Griffin 4-yard run (Mossimo Sbaccia kick), 0:25
- Dallas – Collin Drafts: 25/39, 308 yards, 7 TD, 1 INT
- Jacksonville – Aaron Garcia: 31/47, 318 yards, 8 TD

Rushing

- Dallas – Josh White: 4 att, 3 yards
- Jacksonville – Kirby Griffin: 4 att, 6 yards, 1 TD

Receiving

- Dallas – Larry Brackins: 12 rec, 119 yards, 5 TD
- Jacksonville – Jomo Wilson: 10 rec, 123 yards, 2 TD

The Sharks had control of the game in the 1st half with a 36–7 lead late in the second quarter, although Dallas scored another touchdown to make it 36–14 at the half. The Vigilantes scored the first two touchdowns of the 3rd quarter, and by the end of the 3rd quarter, Jacksonville's lead shrunk to just 43–35. Turnovers had been a problem for Dallas all night, and lost their third fumble of the game in the 4th quarter. The loose ball was scooped up by Jacksonville's Justin Parrish and returned for a touchdown to give the Sharks a 63–41 lead. The 21-point lead would turn into the margin of victory as the Sharks took the game by a 70–49 score.

Aaron Garcia threw for 318 yards and 8 touchdowns. Jomo Wilson caught 4 touchdowns in the game, and with 123 yards, was the team's leading receiver.

=== Week 8: vs. Cleveland Gladiators ===
Quarter	1	2	3	4	Total
Gladiators	14	9	7	14	44
Sharks	14	6	7	19	46

at Jacksonville Veterans Memorial Arena, Jacksonville, Florida

- Date: May 22
- Game time: 7:05 pm EDT
- Recap

Game information

1st quarter

- Jacksonville – Dallas Baker 44-yard pass from Aaron Garcia (Patrick Bugg kick)
- Cleveland – Ben Nelson 32-yard pass from John Dutton (Matt Denny kick), 11:18
- Jacksonville – Jomo Wilson 30-yard pass from Aaron Garcia (Mossimo Sbaccia kick), 5:56
- Cleveland – Terrell Browden 1-yard pass from John Dutton (Matt Denny kick), 0:00

2nd quarter

- Jacksonville – Jomo Wilson 31-yard pass from Aaron Garcia (Mossimo Sbaccia kick no good), 13:14
- Cleveland – John Dutton 3-yard run (Matt Denny kick no good), 5:20
- Cleveland – Matt Denny 17-yard field goal

3rd quarter

- Jacksonville – Dallas Baker 28-yard pass from Aaron Garcia (Mossimo Sbaccia kick), 3:30
- Cleveland – Ben Nelson 25-yard pass from John Dutton (Matt Denny kick), 0:00

4th quarter

- Jacksonville – Jomo Wilson 20-yard pass from Aaron Garcia (Mossimo Sbaccia kick), 13:03
- Cleveland – Russell Monk 1-yard run (Matt Denny kick), 8:22
- Jacksonville – Jason Willis 6-yard pass from Aaron Garcia (Mossimo Sbaccia kick no good), 3:38
- Jacksonville – Aaron Garcia 3-yard run (Mossimo Sbaccia kick no good), 0:55
- Cleveland – Ben Nelson 2-yard pass from John Dutton (Matt Denny kick), 0:14
- Cleveland – John Dutton: 29/52, 314 yards, 4 TD
- Jacksonville – Aaron Garcia: 23/40, 290 yards, 6 TD, 2 INT

Rushing

- Cleveland – John Dutton: 1 att, 3 yards, 1 TD
- Jacksonville – Kirby Griffin: 2 att, 21 yards

Receiving

- Cleveland – Ben Nelson: 11 rec, 136 yards, 3 TD
- Jacksonville – Jomo Wilson: 7 rec, 116 yards, 3 TD

=== Week 9: at Spokane Shock ===
Quarter	1	2	3	4	Total
Sharks	14	21	15	7	57
Shock	13	20	14	20	67

at Spokane Veterans Memorial Arena, Spokane, Washington

- Date: May 29
- Game time: 10:00 pm EDT
- Game attendance: 10,460
- Referee: Shane Anderson
- Recap

Game information

1st quarter

- Jacksonville – Jeron Harvey 6-yard pass from Aaron Garcia (Massimo Scaccia kick), 10:53
- Jacksonville – Jomo Wilson 6-yard pass from Aaron Garcia (Massimo Scaccia kick), 7:06
- Spokane – Raul Vijil 16-yard pass from Kyle Rowley (Taylor Rowan kick), 2:36
- Spokane – Kevin McCullough 2-yard interception return (Taylor Rowan kick no good), 0:40

2nd quarter

- Jacksonville – Jeron Harvey 4-yard pass from Aaron Garcia (Massimo Scaccia kick), 11:51
- Spokane – Raul Vijil 32-yard pass from Kyle Rowley (Taylor Rowan kick no good), 9:52
- Jacksonville – Dallas Baker 30-yard pass from Aaron Garcia (Massimo Scaccia kick), 6:47
- Spokane – Quorey Payne 54-yard kickoff return (Taylor Rowan kick), 5:45
- Jacksonville – Dallas Baker 11-yard pass from Aaron Garcia (Massimo Scaccia kick), 2:13
- Spokane – Raul Vijil 16-yard pass from Kyle Rowley (Taylor Rowan kick), 0:16

3rd quarter

- Spokane – Raul Vijil 16-yard pass from Kyle Rowley (Taylor Rowan kick), 11:20
- Jacksonville – Jeron Harvey 27-yard pass from Aaron Garcia (Massimo Scaccia kick), 8:36
- Spokane – Huey Whittaker 4-yard pass from Kyle Rowley (Taylor Rowan kick), 6:04
- Jacksonville – Kirby Griffin 1-yard run (Bernard Morris run), 1:13

4th quarter

- Spokane – Raul Vijil 7-yard pass from Kyle Rowley (Taylor Rowan kick no good), 14:26
- Spokane – Raul Vijil 16-yard pass from Kyle Rowley (Taylor Rowan kick)
- Jacksonville – Kirby Griffin 1-yard run (Massimo Scaccia kick), 0:55
- Spokane – Raul Vijil 9-yard pass from Kyle Rowley (Taylor Rowan kick), 0:48

Passing

- Jacksonville – Aaron Garcia: 26/45, 275 yards, 6 TD, 2 INT
- Spokane – Kyle Rowley: 20/27, 210 yards, 8 TD

Rushing

- Jacksonville – Kirby Griffin: 4 att, 5 yards, 2 TD
- Spokane – Harrison Nikolao: 2 att, −1 yards

Receiving

- Jacksonville – Jomo Wilson: 10 rec, 114 yards, 1 TD
- Spokane – Raul Vijil: 11 rec, 130 yards, 7 TD

=== Week 10: at Chicago Rush ===
Quarter	1	2	3	4	Total
Sharks	20	12	20	12	64
Rush	14	14	21	7	56

at Allstate Arena, Rosemont, Illinois

- Date: June 4
- Game time: 8:00 pm EDT
- Game attendance: 7,430
- Referee: Tom McCabe
- Recap

Game information

1st quarter

- Jacksonville – Irving Campbell 50-yard kickoff return (Paul Edinger kick), 14:01
- Chicago – Allen Turner 13-yard pass from Russ Michna (Chris Gould kick), 10:29
- Jacksonville – Dallas Baker 17-yard pass from Aaron Garcia (Paul Edinger kick), 8:37
- Chicago – Russ Michna 1-yard run (Chris Gould kick), 2:22
- Jacksonville – Jomo Wilson 57-yard kickoff return (Paul Edinger kick no good), 1:18

2nd quarter

- Chicago – Robert Boss 7-yard pass from Russ Michna (Chris Gould kick), 9:23
- Chicago – Chris Martin 31-yard interception return (Chris Gould kick), 5:38
- Jacksonville – Dallas Baker 7-yard pass from Aaron Garcia (Paul Edinger kick), 0:55
- Jacksonville – Safety, 0:46
- Jacksonville – Paul Edinger 17-yard field goal, 0:03

3rd quarter

- Jacksonville – Jason Willis 24-yard pass from Aaron Garcia (Paul Edinger kick), 12:21
- Chicago – Samie Parker 30-yard pass from Russ Michna (Chris Gould kick), 11:14
- Jacksonville – Jomo Wilson 43-yard pass from Aaron Garcia (Paul Edinger kick no good), 9:05
- Chicago – Allen Turner 7-yard pass from Russ Michna (Chris Gould kick), 5:17
- Jacksonville – Dallas Baker 48-yard pass from Aaron Garcia (Paul Edinger kick), 2:44
- Chicago – Samie Parker 23-yard pass from Russ Michna (Chris Gould kick), 0:00

4th quarter

- Jacksonville – Dallas Baker 7-yard pass from Aaron Garcia (Paul Edinger kick no good), 10:20
- Jacksonville – Dallas Baker 19-yard pass from Aaron Garcia (Paul Edinger kick no good), 7:21
- Chicago – Robert Boss 10-yard run (Chris Gould kick), 4:57

Passing

- Jacksonville – Aaron Garcia: 25/37, 304 yards, 7 TD, 2 INT
- Chicago – Russ Michna: 22/31, 292 yards, 5 TD

Rushing

- Jacksonville – Kirby Griffin: 4 att, 21 yards
- Chicago – Robert Boss: 3 att, 14 yards, 1 TD

Receiving

- Jacksonville – Dallas Baker: 11 rec, 150 yards, 5 TD
- Chicago – DeJuan Alfonzo: 10 rec, 124 yards

=== Week 12: at Orlando Predators ===
Quarter	1	2	3	4	Total
Sharks	2	20	6	20	48
Predators	22	24	7	17	70

at Amway Arena, Orlando, Florida

- Date: June 18
- Game time: 8:00 pm EDT
- Game attendance: 14,010
- Referee: Greg Lefils
- Recap

Game information

1st quarter

- Orlando – Robert Quiroga 4-yard pass from Nick Hill (Carlos Martinez kick), 12:22
- Orlando – Safety, 11:48
- Orlando – Nick Hill 19-yard run (Carlos Martinez kick), 7:06
- Orlando – Robert Quiroga 9-yard pass from Nick Hill (Carlos Martinez kick blocked), 1:23
- Jacksonville – RaJon Myles blocked PAT return, 1:23

2nd quarter

- Jacksonville – Jomo Wilson 3-yard pass from Aaron Garcia (Paul Edinger kick no good), 12:44
- Orlando – T.T. Toliver 16-yard pass from Nick Hill (Carlos Martinez kick), 9:33
- Jacksonville – Jason Willis 5-yard pass from Aaron Garcia (Paul Edinger kick), 4:36
- Orlando – T.T. Toliver 4-yard run (Carlos Martinez kick)
- Orlando – T.T. Toliver 18-yard pass from Nick Hill (Carlos Martinez kick), 0:24
- Jacksonville – Dallas Baker 36-yard pass from Aaron Garcia (Paul Edinger kick), 0:19
- Orlando – Carlos Martinez 28-yard field goal, 0:00

3rd quarter

- Jacksonville – Jeron Harvey 47-yard pass from Aaron Garcia (Paul Edinger kick no good), 6:00
- Orlando – Jerrian James 16-yard pass from Nick Hill (Carlos Martinez kick), 1:50

4th quarter

- Jacksonville – Dallas Baker 11-yard pass from Aaron Garcia (Paul Edinger kick), 14:38
- Orlando – T.T. Toliver 19-yard pass from Nick Hill (Carlos Martinez kick), 10:12
- Jacksonville – Jeron Harvey 5-yard pass from Aaron Garcia (Paul Edinger kick), 7:08
- Orlando – Nick Hill 4-yard run (Carlos Martinez kick), 5:11
- Jacksonville – Jason Willis 12-yard pass from Aaron Garcia (Paul Edinger kick no good), 2:55
- Orlando – Carlos Martinez 10-yard field goal, 0:10

Passing

- Jacksonville – Aaron Garcia: 22/35, 290 yards, 7 TD, 1 INT
- Orlando – Nick Hill: 20/31, 232 yards, 6 TD, 1 INT

Rushing

- Jacksonville – Aaron Garcia: 1 att, 7 yards
- Orlando – Nick Hill: 6 att, 33 yards, 2 TD

Receiving

- Jacksonville – Dallas Baker: 5 rec, 91 yards, 2 TD
- Orlando – T.T. Toliver: 8 rec, 88 yards, 3 TD

=== Week 13: vs. Arizona Rattlers ===
Quarter	1	2	3	4	Total
Rattlers	14	10	21	21	66
Sharks	0	10	14	26	50

at Jacksonville Veterans Memorial Arena, Jacksonville, Florida

- Date: June 26
- Game time: 7:05 pm EDT
- Recap

=== Week 14: vs. Alabama Vipers ===
Quarter	1	2	3	4	Total
Vipers	6	21	0	20	47
Sharks	6	28	7	21	62

at Jacksonville Veterans Memorial Arena, Jacksonville, Florida

- Date: July 3
- Game time: 7:05 pm EDT
- Recap

Game information

1st quarter

- Jacksonville – Jason Willis 4-yard pass from Aaron Garcia (Paul Edinger kick no good), 9:06
- Alabama – Kevin Eakin 5-yard run (Steve Azar kick no good)

2nd quarter

- Jacksonville – Jason Willis 6-yard pass from Aaron Garcia (Paul Edinger kick), 12:17
- Alabama – Michael Johnson 24-yard pass from Tony Colston (Steve Azar kick), 7:44
- Jacksonville – Bernard Morris 2-yard run (Paul Edinger kick), 5:31
- Alabama – C.J. Johnson 37-yard pass from Tony Colston (Steve Azar kick), 4:15
- Jacksonville – 9-yard kickoff return, 3:05
- Alabama – C.J. Johnson 18-yard pass from Tony Colston (Steve Azar kick), 1:06
- Jacksonville – Bernard Morris 1-yard run (Paul Edinger kick), 0:18

3rd quarter

- Jacksonville – Sale' Key 32-yard pass from Aaron Garcia (Paul Edinger kick), 0:40

4th quarter

- Jacksonville – Will Alford 20-yard fumble return (Paul Edinger kick), 12:28
- Alabama – C.J. Johnson 10-yard pass from Tony Colston (Paul Edinger kick no good), 8:22
- Jacksonville – Kirby Griffin 2-yard run (Paul Edinger kick), 5:01
- Alabama – Larry Shipp 7-yard pass from Tony Colston (Steve Azar kick)
- Jacksonville – Sale' Key 1-yard run (Paul Edinger kick)
- Alabama – C.J. Johnson 5-yard run (Steve Azar kick), 2:11

Passing

- Alabama – Tony Colston: 22/37, 288 yards, 5 TD
- Jacksonville – Aaron Garcia: 19/35, 247 yards, 3 TD

Rushing

- Alabama – Kevin Eakin and C.J. Johnson: 1 att, 5 yards, 1 TD
- Jacksonville – Kirby Griffin: 2 att, 6 yards, 1 TD

Receiving

- Alabama – C.J. Johnson: 10 rec, 113 yards, 3 TD
- Jacksonville – Sale' Key: 7 rec, 110 yards, 1 TD

=== Week 15: at Utah Blaze ===
Quarter	1	2	3	4	Total
Sharks	13	27	20	7	67
Blaze	7	7	21	21	56

at E Center, West Valley City, Utah

- Date: July 10
- Game time: 9:05 pm EDT
- Game attendance: 4,508
- Referee: Steve Strimling
- Recap

Game information

1st quarter

- Jacksonville – Jomo Wilson 55-yard kickoff return (Paul Edinger kick no good), 14:06
- Utah – Wendall Williams 23-yard pass from Brett Elliott (Ben Scott kick), 10:08
- Jacksonville – Kirby Griffin 3-yard run (Paul Edinger kick), 3:30

2nd quarter

- Jacksonville – Kirby Griffin 28-yard pass from Aaron Garcia (Paul Edinger kick no good), 13:12
- Utah – Wendall Williams 30-yard pass from Brett Elliott (Ben Scott kick), 10:22
- Jacksonville – Sale' Key 33-yard pass from Aaron Garcia (Paul Edinger kick), 8:30
- Jacksonville – Jason Willis 23-yard pass from Aaron Garcia (Paul Edinger kick), 5:02
- Jacksonville – Dallas Baker 11-yard pass from Aaron Garcia (Paul Edinger kick), 0:24

3rd quarter

- Jacksonville – Jason Perry 40-yard interception return (Paul Edinger kick), 12:31
- Utah – Brandon Hampton 56-yard kickoff return (Ben Scott kick), 11:41
- Jacksonville – Kirby Griffin 2-yard run (Paul Edinger kick), 8:33
- Utah – Aaron Boone 15-yard pass from Brett Elliott (Ben Scott kick), 6:16
- Jacksonville – Isaac Morales 6-yard pass from Aaron Garcia (Paul Edinger kick no good), 4:30
- Utah – Aaron Boone 14-yard pass from Brett Elliott (Ben Scott kick), 0:44

4th quarter

- Jacksonville – Dallas Baker 36-yard pass from Bernard Morris (Paul Edinger kick), 14:24
- Utah – Wendall Williams 20-yard pass from Brett Elliott (Ben Scott kick), 13:13
- Utah – Wendall Williams 25-yard pass from Brett Elliott (Ben Scott kick), 8:51
- Utah – Aaron Boone 3-yard pass from Brett Elliott (Ben Scott kick), 0:38

Passing

- Jacksonville – Aaron Garcia: 18/21, 222 yards, 5 TD
- Utah – Brett Elliott: 26/50, 318 yards, 7 TD, 2 INT

Rushing

- Jacksonville – Kirby Griffin: 3 att, 6 yards, 2 TD
- Utah – Damian Walker: 2 att, −2 yards

Receiving

- Jacksonville – Dallas Baker: 9 rec, 123 yards, 2 TD
- Utah – Wendall Williams: 9 rec, 148 yards, 4 TD

By defeating the Blaze, the Sharks clinched a playoff berth.

=== Week 16: vs. Tampa Bay Storm ===
Quarter	1	2	3	4	Total
Storm	7	7	14	19	47
Sharks	7	14	7	21	49

at Jacksonville Veterans Memorial Arena, Jacksonville, Florida

- Date: July 17
- Game time: 7:05 pm EDT
- Game attendance: 13,011
- Referee: Perry Havener
- Recap

Game information

1st quarter

- Jacksonville – Jason Willis 16-yard pass from Bernard Morris (Paul Edinger kick), 9:48
- Tampa Bay – Tyrone Timmons 5-yard pass from Brett Dietz (Garrett Rivas kick), 6:36

2nd quarter

- Tampa Bay – Hank Edwards 13-yard pass from Brett Dietz (Garrett Rivas kick), 14:54
- Jacksonville – Kirby Griffin 3-yard run (Paul Edinger kick), 11:34
- Jacksonville – Bernard Morris 19-yard run (Paul Edinger kick), 2:09

3rd quarter

- Tampa Bay – DeAndrew Rubin 25-yard pass from Brett Dietz (Garrett Rivas kick), 13:59
- Jacksonville – Jason Willis 9-yard pass from Bernard Morris (Paul Edinger kick), 8:26
- Tampa Bay – Thomas Kaleita 4-yard pass from Brett Dietz (Garrett Rivas kick), 4:52

4th quarter

- Jacksonville – Dallas Baker 3-yard pass from Bernard Morris (Paul Edinger kick), 14:17
- Tampa Bay – Hank Edwards 15-yard pass from Brett Dietz (Garrett Rivas kick no good), 12:13
- Jacksonville – Dee Webb 4-yard pass from Bernard Morris (Paul Edinger kick), 7:16
- Tampa Bay – Tyrone Timmons 7-yard pass from Brett Dietz (Garrett Rivas kick), 4:39
- Jacksonville – Sale' Key 1-yard run (Paul Edinger kick)
- Tampa Bay – Lawrence Samuels 5-yard pass from Brett Dietz (Tyrone Timmons pass no good), 0:08

Passing

- Tampa Bay – Brett Dietz: 22/32, 297 yards, 7 TD
- Jacksonville – Bernard Morris: 21/40, 228 yards, 4 TD

Rushing

- Tampa Bay – Terrence Royal: 2 att, 2 yards
- Jacksonville – Bernard Morris: 8 att, 30 yards, 1 TD

Receiving

- Tampa Bay – Hank Edwards: 7 rec, 104 yards, 2 TD
- Jacksonville – Jason Willis: 11 rec, 93 yards, 2 TD

=== Week 17: at Bossier–Shreveport Battle Wings ===
Quarter	1	2	3	4	Total
Sharks	13	6	14	15	48
Battle Wings	13	7	0	0	20

at CenturyTel Center, Bossier City, Louisiana

- Date: July 24
- Game time: 8:05 pm EDT
- Game attendance: 6,015
- Referee: Scott Vaughn
- Recap

Game information

1st quarter

- Bossier–Shreveport – Kinsmon Lancaster 23-yard pass from Jimmy Welker (Nick Gatto kick no good), 10:50
- Jacksonville – Jason Willis 24-yard pass from Bernard Morris (Paul Edinger kick no good), 9:02
- Bossier–Shreveport – Kinsmon Lancaster 7-yard pass from Jimmy Welker (Nick Gatto kick), 4:23
- Jacksonville – Kirby Griffin 8-yard run (Paul Edinger kick), 0:50

2nd quarter

- Bossier–Shreveport – Moqut Ruffins 14-yard pass from Jimmy Welker (Nick Gatto kick), 8:51
- Jacksonville – Bernard Morris 24-yard run (Paul Edinger kick no good), 6:25

3rd quarter

- Jacksonville – Kirby Griffin 1-yard run (Paul Edinger kick), 8:45
- Jacksonville – Irving Campbell 6-yard pass from Bernard Morris (Paul Edinger kick), 3:13

4th quarter

- Jacksonville – Dallas Baker 34-yard pass from Bernard Morris (Paul Edinger kick no good), 10:50
- Jacksonville – Safety, 8:52
- Jacksonville – Kirby Griffin 3-yard run (Paul Edinger kick), 3:56

Passing

- Jacksonville – Bernard Morris: 19/25, 228 yards, 3 TD
- Bossier–Shreveport – Jimmy Welker: 11/17, 107 yards, 3 TD

Rushing

- Jacksonville – Bernard Morris: 5 att, 42 yards, 1 TD
- Bossier–Shreveport – Jason Schule: 5 att, 16 yards

Receiving

- Jacksonville – Irving Campbell: 9 rec, 103 yards, 1 TD
- Bossier–Shreveport – Kinsmon Lancaster: 6 rec, 57 yards, 2 TD

=== Week 18: vs. Spokane Shock ===
Quarter	1	2	3	4	Total
Shock	7	14	7	21	49
Sharks	14	19	14	17	64

at Jacksonville Veterans Memorial Arena, Jacksonville, Florida

- Date: July 30
- Game time: 7:30 pm EDT
- Game attendance: 13,000
- Recap

Game information

1st quarter

- Spokane – Markee White 22-yard pass from Kyle Rowley (Taylor Rowan kick), 8:01
- Jacksonville – Jason Willis 11-yard pass from Aaron Garcia (Paul Edinger kick), 4:50
- Jacksonville – Dallas Baker 10-yard pass from Aaron Garcia (Paul Edinger kick), 1:18

2nd quarter

- Spokane – Markee White 6-yard pass from Kyle Rowley (Taylor Rowan kick), 13:16
- Jacksonville – Jason Willis 3-yard pass from Aaron Garcia (Paul Edinger kick), 8:45
- Jacksonville – Jeff Littlejohn 47-yard fumble return (Paul Edinger kick no good), 5:14
- Spokane – Markee White 30-yard pass from Kyle Rowley (Taylor Rowan kick), 2:24
- Jacksonville – Bernard Morris 1-yard run (Paul Edinger kick no good), 0:02

3rd quarter

- Spokane – Markee White 4-yard pass from Kyle Rowley (Taylor Rowan kick), 7:19
- Jacksonville – Jeron Harvey 10-yard pass from Aaron Garcia (Paul Edinger kick), 6:04
- Jacksonville – Jeron Harvey 7-yard pass from Aaron Garcia (Paul Edinger kick), 0:48

4th quarter

- Spokane – Markee White 8-yard pass from Kyle Rowley (Markee White pass)
- Jacksonville – Paul Edinger 12-yard field goal
- Spokane – Huey Whittaker 31-yard pass from Brian Zbydniewski (Taylor Rowan kick), 6:38
- Jacksonville – Jeron Harvey 48-yard pass from Aaron Garcia (Paul Edinger kick), 5:12
- Spokane – Huey Whittaker 8-yard pass from Brian Zbydniewski (Taylor Rowan kick no good), 0:56
- Jacksonville – Jason Willis 24-yard pass from Aaron Garcia (Paul Edinger kick), 0:28
- Spokane – Kyle Rowley: 19/35, 275 yards, 5 TD, 2 INT
- Jacksonville – Aaron Garcia: 25/37, 293 yards, 7 TD

Rushing

- Spokane – Clay Harrell: 1 att, 0 yards
- Jacksonville – Bernard Morris: 3 att, 4 yards, 1 TD

Receiving

- Spokane – Huey Whittaker: 11 rec, 175 yards, 2 TD
- Jacksonville – Jason Willis: 9 rec, 102 yards, 3 TD

With the win over the Shock, the Sharks clinched the American Conference's best record.

== Playoffs ==
=== American Conference semifinals: vs. Orlando Predators ===
Quarter	1	2	3	4	Total
Predators	7	21	14	31	73
Sharks	13	14	13	29	69

at Jacksonville Veterans Memorial Arena, Jacksonville, Florida

- Date: August 6
- Game time: 8:00 pm EDT
- Game attendance: 10,000

Game information

1st quarter

- Jacksonville – Dallas Baker 10-yard pass from Aaron Garcia (Paul Edinger kick), 11:38
- Orlando – Bobby Sippio 1-yard run (Carlos Martinez Kick), 5:27
- Jacksonville – Dallas Baker 17-yard pass from Aaron Garcia (Paul Edinger kick no good), 2:41

2nd quarter

- Orlando – Bobby Sippio 7-yard pass from Nick Hill (Carlos Martinez Kick), 14:56
- Jacksonville – Sale' Key 2-yard run (Paul Edinger kick), 9:15
- Orlando – T.T. Toliver 20-yard pass from Nick Hill (Carlos Martinez Kick), 5:38
- Jacksonville – Jason Willis 25-yard pass from Aaron Garcia (Paul Edinger kick), 4:41
- Orlando – Bobby Sippio 2-yard pass from Nick Hill (Carlos Martinez Kick), 0:36

3rd quarter

- Jacksonville – Henry Taylor 0-yard fumble return (Paul Edinger kick), 14:10
- Orlando – T.T. Toliver 5-yard pass from Nick Hill (Carlos Martinez Kick), 6:05
- Jacksonville – Kirby Griffin 2-yard run (Paul Edinger kick), 2:32
- Orlando – James Lynch 36-yard run (Carlos Martinez Kick), 1:00

4th quarter

- Orlando – James Lynch 2-yard run (Carlos Martinez Kick), 14:33
- Jacksonville – Jason Willis 3-yard pass from Aaron Garcia (Paul Edinger kick no good), 8:47
- Orlando – Bobby Sippio 5-yard pass from Nick Hill (Carlos Martinez Kick), 7:20
- Jacksonville – Dallas Baker 30-yard pass from Aaron Garcia (Aaron Garcia pass), 6:09
- Orlando – Bobby Sippio 3-yard run (Carlos Martinez Kick), 3:51
- Jacksonville – Sale' Key 6-yard pass from Aaron Garcia (Aaron Garcia pass), 0:57
- Orlando – Carlos Martinez 20-yard field goal
- Jacksonville – Jeron Harvey 13-yard pass from Aaron Garcia (Paul Edinger kick), 0:20
- Orlando – Bobby Sippio 16-yard pass from Nick Hill (Carlos Martinez Kick), 0:08

Passing

- Orlando – Nick Hill: 23/39, 246 yards, 6 TD
- Jacksonville – Aaron Garcia: 31/45, 346 yards, 7 TD, 1 INT

Rushing

- Orlando – James Lynch: 5 att, 84 yards, 2 TD
- Jacksonville – Sale' Key: 2 att, 4 yards, 1 TD

Receiving

- Orlando – Bobby Sippio: 9 rec, 113 yards, 4 TD
- Jacksonville – Dallas Baker: 7 rec, 91 yards, 3 TD
