= Temecula Valley High School =

Public high school in Temecula, California, United States

Location
- 31555 Rancho Vista Road; Temecula, California 92592; United States; 33°30′08″N 117°06′59″W

Information
- School type: Secondary
- Established: 1985
- School district: Temecula Valley Unified School District
- Superintendent: Gary W. Woods
- Area trustee: Joseph Komrosky, Trustee Area 4
- Principal: Donna Lione
- Faculty: 110.81 (2023–24) (on an FTE basis)
- Grades: 9 – 12
- Enrollment: 2,735 (2023–24)
- Student to teacher ratio: 24.68
- Language: English
- Colors: Brown, Gold
- Mascot: Golden Bear
- Website: Temecula Valley High School

Temecula Valley High School, known by locals as TV, is a public high school for grades 9 to 12 in Temecula, California. The school opened in 1985 as the city's first high school. When it was built, it was a part of the Elsinore Union High School District (now the Lake Elsinore Unified School District) until the Temecula Valley Unified School District was founded. It is a California Distinguished School.

== History ==
In its first year, the school's attendance consisted of 350 students and 17 teachers. Over the years, attendance has increased to over 2,700.

In order to keep up with increasing enrollment, the school has undergone several changes. In August 2007, Temecula Valley High opened a new multimillion-dollar gym. In May 2013, Temecula Valley High School completed a multimillion-dollar performing arts center. In February 2015, a renovation of the Stadium was completed, changing the field to turf rather than grass.

=== Nixon Fire ===
In 2024, California Department of Forestry and Fire Protection and Riverside Fire Department used Temecula Valley High School as an evacuation center during the Nixon Fire.

== Athletics ==
The Temecula Valley's wrestling team won its 31st consecutive league title in 2019, and has won 36 CIF titles, and 3 Masters titles.and also, Temecula valley high schools water polo team had won their first state title on November 22 at Mt. San Antonio College.

== Activities ==
Temecula Valley High School features more than 100 clubs and student organizations. Of these, three are predominately competitive: CyberPatriots; Mock Trial; and Science Olympiad.

There are two academic groups, California Scholarship Federation and National Honor Society.

In 2023, Temecula Valley High School's CyberPatriots won the 5th Annual California Mayors Cyber Cup, securing a ceremony at Temecula City Hall for the team "Crypto Scammers".

== Notable alumni ==
- Jean-Paul Afif (born 1980), former basketball player
- Patrick Afif (born 1983), former football player
- Sophina DeJesus (born 1994), dancer and gymnast
- Brandon Ganuelas-Rosser (born 1994), basketball player
- Matt Ganuelas-Rosser (born 1990), former basketball player
- Easton Gibbs (born 2001), professional football player
- Christy Hemme (born 1980), professional wrestler and ring announcer
- Reed Johnson (born 1976), former baseball player
- Shannon Messenger (born 1981), author
- Lisa Misipeka (born 1975), former track and field athlete
- Kyler Phillips (born 1995), mixed martial artist
- Brooks Pounders (born 1990), former baseball player
- Justin Simon (born 1996), professional basketball player
- Taylor Tomlinson (born 1993), comedian, actress, and writer
- Kelsie Whitmore (born 1998), professional baseball player
