= Carlos Martínez (American football) =

American football player (born 1980)

Carlos Martinez
No. 7, 3
- Position: Placekicker

Personal information
- Born: June 4, 1980 (age 46); Council Bluffs, Iowa, U.S.
- Listed height: 5 ft 8 in (1.73 m)
- Listed weight: 175 lb (79 kg)

Career information
- High school: Papillion (NE)-La Vista Senior
- College: Buena Vista
- NFL draft: 2001: undrafted

Career history
- Fresno Frenzy (2002); Philadelphia Eagles (2003)*; Tampa Bay Buccaneers (2004)*; Dallas Desperados (2004–2006); Atlanta Falcons (2006)*; Dallas Cowboys (2006)*; Georgia Force (2007–2008); Orlando Predators (2010); Florida Tuskers (2010); Georgia Force (2011–2012); Philadelphia Soul (2013–2015)
- * Offseason or practice squad member only

Awards and highlights
- AFL Kicker of the Year (2011); First-team All-Arena (2011); 2× Second-team All-Arena (2010, 2013)

Career AFL statistics
- FG Made: 76
- FG Att: 148
- PAT Made: 949
- PAT Att: 1,055
- Total tackles: 96.5
- Stats at ArenaFan.com

Carlos Martinez (born June 4, 1980) is an American former professional football placekicker. His career included stints in af2 for the Fresno Frenzy, in the Arena Football League (AFL) for the Dallas Desperados, and in the National Football League (NFL) for the Dallas Cowboys.

== Early life ==
Martinez attended Papillion La Vista Senior High School and was a letterman and a star in football, soccer and wrestling. In football, he was a three-time All-State honoree and set the Nebraska prep record for career field goals with 28 field goals. In wrestling, he won the state championship as a senior.

== College career ==
Martinez played college football at Buena Vista University, and was a four-year letterman in football as a kicker. He was a three-time All-America selection, a three-time All-IIAC honoree. As a senior, he was also named the NCAA Division III Kicker of the Year and as a junior, he was named the team Special Teams Player of the Year. He is the all-time field goal leader at Buena Vista with 48 and second all-time in Division III. Martinez also excelled as a punter in college, with an average exceeding 40 yards. Martinez capped off his senior season at BVU in 2002 with a selection to play for the American Football Coaches Association Division III All-Star Team which represented the United States against Mexico National Team in the 2001 Aztec Bowl. Martinez was named the USA MVP by the media in attendance as he averaged 55.2 per punt (8-441 yds.) to consistently pin Mexico deep in its own end in the contest.

== Professional career ==
=== Dallas Cowboys ===
Martinez returned to BVU in the fall of 2006 as an assistant football coach before being signed by the Dallas Cowboys. The Cowboys released Martinez in May 2007.

=== Orlando Predators ===
In 2010, Martinez returned for the Orlando Predators in the Arena Football League. He missed the kick to advance the Orlando Predators to ArenaBowl XXIII, however, he had a league-high 13 field goals, and made 104 PATs.

=== Florida Tuskers ===
His performance earned him another signing for an outdoor American football league, with the Florida Tuskers of the United Football League.

=== Philadelphia Soul ===
As a member of the Philadelphia Soul in 2013, Martinez was named Second-team All-Arena. Martinez was assigned to the Soul for the 2014 season on October 29, 2013.
