= Antonio Burks (basketball, born 1982) =

American professional basketball player

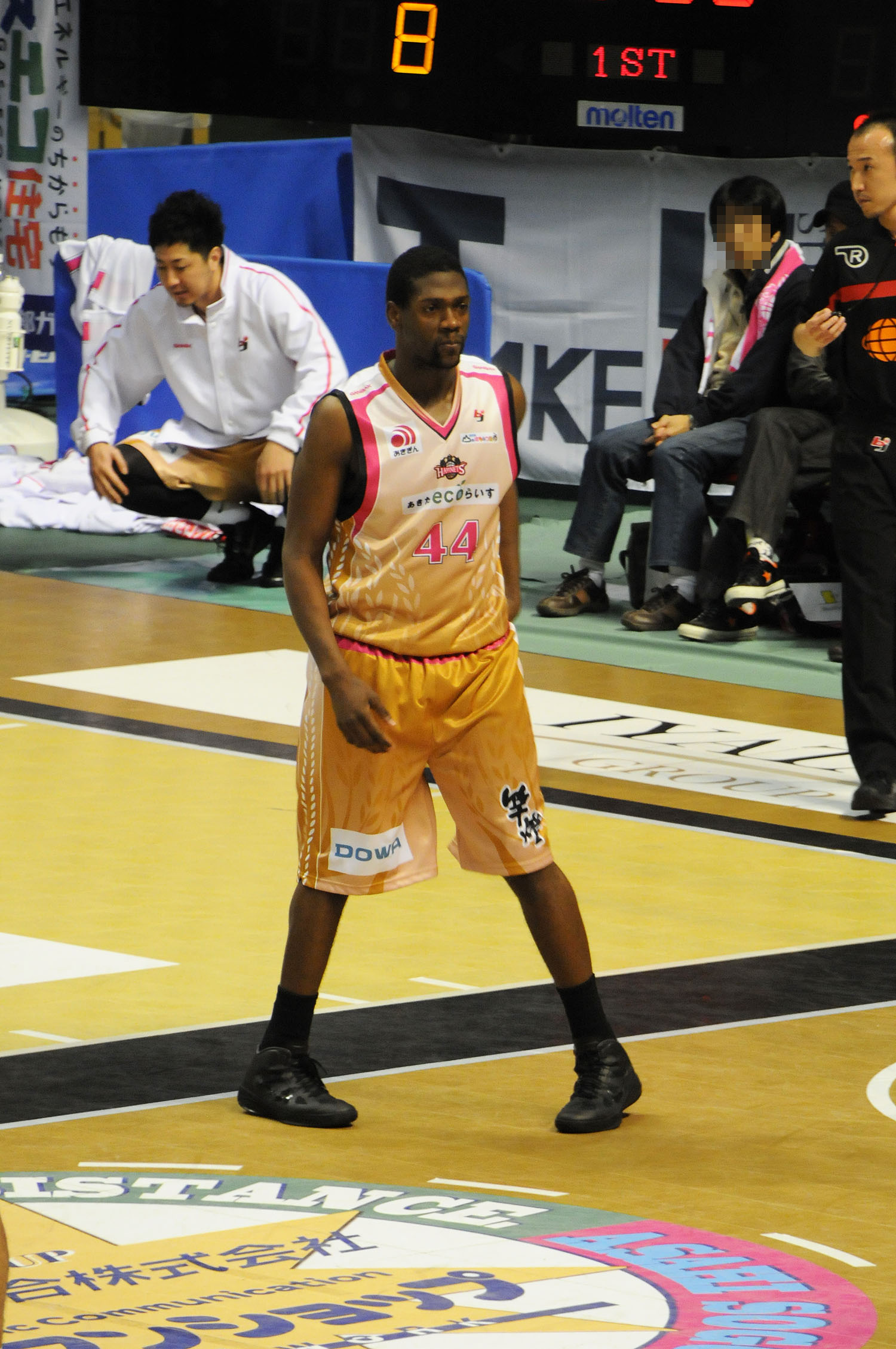
- Antonio Burks at Akita Municipal Gymnasium of Japan

Personal information
- Born: May 30, 1982 (age 44) Texarkana, Arkansas, U.S.
- Listed height: 6 ft 5 in (1.96 m)
- Listed weight: 220 lb (100 kg)

Career information
- High school: Arkansas (Texarkana, Arkansas)
- College: Jacksonville College; Moberly Area Community College; Stephen F. Austin State University
- Position: Shooting guard, Small forward

Career history
- 2004–2006: Ulriken Eagles
- 2006–2008: Vermont Frost Heaves
- 2008–2010: Niigata Albirex BB
- 2010–2011: Akita Northern Happinets
- 2011–2012: Ulriken Eagles
- 2011–2013: Saint John Mill Rats

Career highlights
- 2x ABA All Star-Game (2007, 2008)

Antonio Burks (born 30 May 1982) is an American professional basketball player who played for the Saint John Mill Rats of the National Basketball League of Canada. He was born in Texarkana, Arkansas. Burks is a 6-foot-5-inch (1.96 m) and 220 pounds (100 kg) guard-forward. Member of Omega Psi Phi. Burks now is a coach and assistant principal for the Rice Independent School District in Rice, Texas.

== College career ==
Burks played at Arkansas High School, Jacksonville College, Moberly Area Community College and Stephen F. Austin State University.

A highlight of Burks's college career came on February 25, 2004, when as a member of the Stephen F. Austin Lumberjacks, he scored 35 points, including 7 three-pointers, to go along with 12 rebounds in a 63–60 win over Lamar University.

== College statistics ==
Year	Team	GP	GS	MPG	FG%	3P%	FT%	RPG	APG	SPG	BPG	PPG
2002–03	SFA	28	3	18.8	.490	.429	.550	3.46	1.00	0.46	0.04	9.14
2003–04	SFA	30	30	30.1	.493	.476	.756	4.53	1.37	0.50	0.13	15.30
Career		58	33	24.6	.492	.459	.689	4.02	1.19	0.48	0.09	12.33

== Professional career ==
Burks was the first player ever that Vermont Frost Heaves signed. He was re-signed by the team on August 21, 2007. He also played professionally in Norway.

On November 27, 2011, it was announced that the Saint John Mill Rats of the National Basketball League of Canada had signed Burks to their active roster.

== Career statistics ==
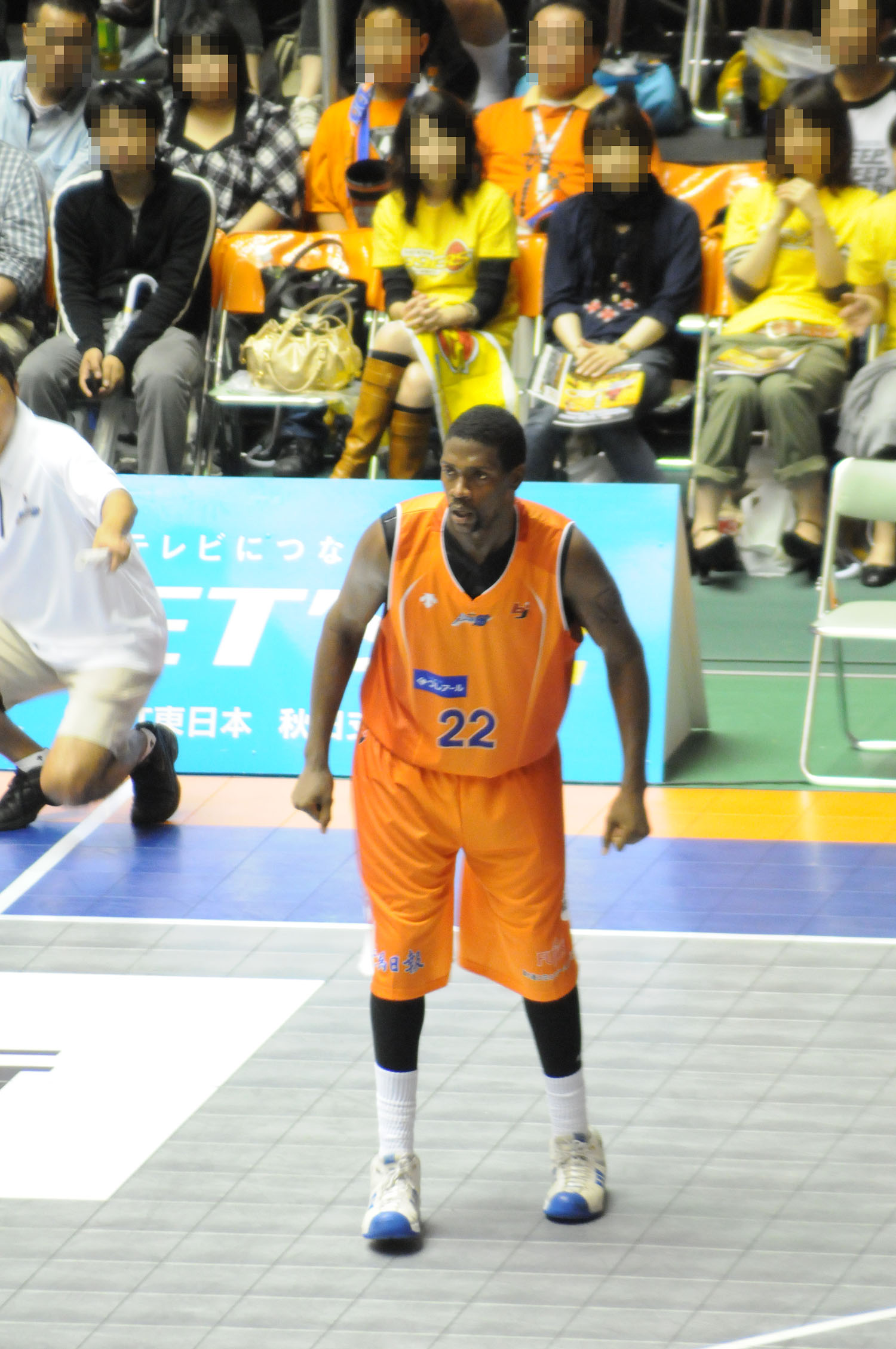
Burks with Niigata

Legend
GP	Games played	GS	Games started	MPG	Minutes per game
FG%	Field goal percentage	3P%	3-point field goal percentage	FT%	Free throw percentage
RPG	Rebounds per game	APG	Assists per game	SPG	Steals per game
BPG	Blocks per game	PPG	Points per game	**Bold**	Career high

=== Regular season ===
Year	Team	GP	GS	MPG	FG%	3P%	FT%	RPG	APG	SPG	BPG	PPG
2008–09	Niigata	32	27	24.7	.412	.384	.700	4.6	1.6	0.6	0.2	13.0
2009–10	Niigata	52	39	25.7	.422	.399	.734	6.2	1.9	1.1	0.3	13.1
2010–11	Akita	47	11	21.0	.418	.392	.694	3.4	1.3	0.4	0.1	10.9
2011–12	Saint John	30	2	19.2	.437	.415	.625	2.33	1.60	0.37	0.07	8.30
2012–13	Saint John	43	8	19.3	.421	.446	.682	2.23	1.09	0.28	0.14	9.60

=== Playoffs ===
Year	Team	GP	GS	MPG	FG%	3P%	FT%	RPG	APG	SPG	BPG	PPG
2010–11	Akita	2		9.5	.333	.200	.000	2.0	1.5	0.0	0.0	3.5
2011–12	Saint John	2		23.0	.154	.125	.000	3.0	1.5	0.5	0.0	2.5
2012–13	Saint John	3		22.0	.258	.333	.000	2.3	0.7	0.0	0.3	8.0
