= Dallas Defenders =

Premier Basketball League team

- Founded: 2006
- Folded: 2008
- League: Premier Basketball League; 2008
- Team history: Dallas Defenders; 2008
- Based in: Addison, Texas
- Arena: Alfred J. Loos Fieldhouse
- Colors: black, silver
- Owner: Erin Patton
- Head coach: Willie McCray
- Championships: 0

The Dallas Defenders were a team in the Premier Basketball League (PBL) which began play in 2008.

The team played at the Alfred J. Loos Fieldhouse, which was also the part-time home to the Dallas Chaparrals of the original American Basketball Association. The facility is listed as the seventh-biggest primary/secondary school fieldhouse in the United States.

When the 2008-2009 list of PBL teams was released at the PBL website, Dallas was not listed on it and is, therefore, considered folded.
