= 2010 Arena Football League season =

- League: Arena Football League
- Sport: Arena football
- Duration: April 2, 2010 – August 20, 2010

Regular season
- Season champions: Spokane Shock

AFL playoffs
- American Conference champions: Tampa Bay Storm
- American Conference runners-up: Orlando Predators
- National Conference champions: Spokane Shock
- National Conference runners-up: Milwaukee Iron

ArenaBowl XXIII
- Champions: Spokane Shock
- Runners-up: Tampa Bay Storm
- Finals MVP: Kyle Rowley, SPO

AFL seasons
- ← 2008 2011 →

American: Southwest, South
National: West, Midwest

The 2010 Arena Football League season was the inaugural season of the second incarnation of the Arena Football League, and the 23rd season of indoor football staged under the "Arena Football" brand. The regular season began on April 2, 2010 and ended on July 31. The season ended with ArenaBowl XXIII on August 20.

== Final standings ==
American Conference
South Division
Team	W	L	PCT	PF	PA	DIV	Home	Away
Jacksonville Sharks	12	4	.750	893	806	4–2	7–1	5–3
Tampa Bay Storm	11	5	.687	926	812	3–3	6–2	5–3
Orlando Predators	8	8	.500	865	845	4–2	4–4	4–4
Alabama Vipers	7	9	.437	812	860	1–5	5–3	2–6
Southwest Division
Team	W	L	PCT	PF	PA	DIV	Home	Away
Tulsa Talons	10	6	.625	994	899	6–0	6–2	4–4
Oklahoma City Yard Dawgz	6	10	.375	833	870	3–3	5–3	1–7
Dallas Vigilantes	3	13	.187	800	920	2–4	1–7	2–6
Bossier–Shreveport Battle Wings	3	13	.187	799	1030	1–5	2–6	1–7
National Conference
Midwest Division
Team	W	L	PCT	PF	PA	DIV	Home	Away
Milwaukee Iron	11	5	.687	1043	903	5–1	7–1	4–4
Chicago Rush	10	6	.625	906	873	4–2	5–3	5–3
Cleveland Gladiators	7	9	.437	938	906	2–4	4–4	3–5
Iowa Barnstormers	7	9	.437	829	833	1–5	2–6	5–3
West Division
Team	W	L	PCT	PF	PA	DIV	Home	Away
Spokane Shock	13	3	.812	988	843	4–0	6–2	7–1
Arizona Rattlers	10	6	.625	987	885	2–2	5–3	5–3
Utah Blaze	2	14	.125	742	1040	0–4	1–7	1–7

- Green indicates clinched playoff berth
- Purple indicates division champion
- Gray indicates conference champion

== Schedule ==
Week 1

Date	Home team	Score	Road team
April 2	Iowa	43–61	Chicago
April 2	Spokane	62–74	Milwaukee
April 3	Bossier-Shreveport	54–48	Alabama
April 3	Cleveland	56–61	Arizona
April 3	Tulsa	69–58	Tampa Bay
April 3	Oklahoma City	38–54	Jacksonville

Week 2

Date	Home team	Score	Road team
April 9	Chicago	59–56	Cleveland
April 9	Alabama	63–49	Jacksonville
April 9	Utah	34–68	Spokane
April 10	Tulsa	63–59	Dallas
April 10	Bossier-Shreveport	73–67	Orlando

Week 3

Date	Home team	Score	Road team
April 16	Tampa Bay	54–41	Dallas
April 16	Jacksonville	57–31	Orlando
April 16	Milwaukee	65–48	Iowa
April 16	Arizona	56–70	Chicago
April 17	Oklahoma City	63–50	Cleveland
April 17	Utah	54–63	Alabama
April 17	Spokane	78–70	Bossier-Shreveport

Week 4

Date	Home team	Score	Road team
April 23	Chicago	63–40	Utah
April 23	Arizona	77–76	Tulsa
April 24	Iowa	68–60	Oklahoma City
April 25	Milwaukee	72–61	Tampa Bay

Week 5

Date	Home team	Score	Road team
April 30	Orlando	40–50	Iowa
April 30	Dallas	54–34	Oklahoma City
April 30	Utah	65–46	Bossier-Shreveport
May 1	Jacksonville	62–60	Tulsa
May 1	Tampa Bay	62–61	Arizona
May 1	Alabama	75–67	Milwaukee
May 1	Spokane	68–72	Cleveland

Week 6

Date	Home team	Score	Road team
May 7	Tampa Bay	43–46	Jacksonville
May 7	Milwaukee	71–48	Chicago
May 7	Dallas	59–70	Orlando
May 7	Arizona	56–63	Spokane
May 8	Tulsa	62–56	Alabama
May 8	Oklahoma City	88–79	Bossier-Shreveport
May 8	Iowa	56–70	Cleveland

Week 7

Date	Home team	Score	Road team
May 14	Jacksonville	70–49	Dallas
May 14	Milwaukee	56–55	Utah
May 15	Cleveland	68–55	Tulsa
May 15	Chicago	30–44	Iowa
May 15	Bossier-Shreveport	44–48	Tampa Bay
May 15	Alabama	31–48	Orlando
May 16	Oklahoma City	63–68	Spokane

Week 8

Date	Home team	Score	Road team
May 21	Orlando	58–54	Milwaukee
May 21	Iowa	48–52	Arizona
May 22	Jacksonville	46–44	Cleveland
May 22	Tulsa	67–41	Oklahoma City
May 22	Dallas	56–63	Chicago
May 22	Alabama	56–19	Bossier-Shreveport
May 22	Spokane	77–28	Utah

Week 9

Date	Home team	Score	Road team
May 28	Orlando	50–62	Tampa Bay
May 28	Oklahoma City	65–39	Alabama
May 28	Utah	58–83	Arizona
May 29	Cleveland	49–52	Chicago
May 29	Milwaukee	63–38	Dallas
May 29	Bossier-Shreveport	48–52	Tulsa
May 29	Spokane	67–57	Jacksonville

Week 10

Date	Home team	Score	Road team
June 4	Cleveland	75–39	Utah
June 4	Chicago	56–64	Jacksonville
June 5	Tampa Bay	50–48	Oklahoma City
June 5	Tulsa	54–57	Orlando
June 5	Iowa	44–45	Alabama
June 5	Dallas	69–70	Bossier-Shreveport
June 5	Arizona	68–67	Milwaukee

Week 11

Date	Home team	Score	Road team
June 11	Dallas	51–69	Tulsa
June 11	Arizona	56–55	Oklahoma City
June 12	Orlando	52–53	Spokane
June 12	Milwaukee	82–54	Cleveland
June 12	Bossier-Shreveport	42–48	Iowa
June 12	Alabama	55–61	Tampa Bay
June 12	Utah	50–70	Chicago

Week 12

Date	Home team	Score	Road team
June 18	Orlando	70–48	Jacksonville
June 18	Spokane	63–42	Tulsa
June 19	Cleveland	76–35	Iowa
June 19	Chicago	63–56	Milwaukee
June 19	Alabama	55–52	Dallas
June 19	Utah	40–65	Tampa Bay
June 19	Arizona	79–50	Bossier-Shreveport

Week 13

Date	Home team	Score	Road team
June 25	Tampa Bay	78–39	Bossier-Shreveport
June 26	Jacksonville	50–66	Arizona
June 26	Tulsa	65–44	Cleveland
June 26	Milwaukee	48–62	Spokane
June 26	Chicago	55–42	Orlando
June 26	Oklahoma City	35–31	Dallas
June 26	Iowa	68–32	Utah

Week 14

Date	Home team	Score	Road team
July 2	Utah	56–82	Milwaukee
July 2	Tampa Bay	68–60	Chicago
July 2	Dallas	38–59	Iowa
July 2	Spokane	37–36	Arizona
July 3	Jacksonville	62–47	Alabama
July 3	Orlando	70–77	Cleveland
July 3	Bossier-Shreveport	44–70	Oklahoma City

Week 15

Date	Home team	Score	Road team
July 9	Orlando	45–34	Alabama
July 9	Dallas	34–56	Tampa Bay
July 9	Utah	56–67	Jacksonville
July 10	Cleveland	56–62	Spokane
July 10	Chicago	55–50	Arizona
July 10	Tulsa	74–45	Bossier-Shreveport
July 10	Oklahoma City	52–42	Iowa

Week 16

Date	Home team	Score	Road team
July 16	Iowa	42–48	Spokane
July 16	Arizona	48–20	Utah
July 17	Cleveland	44–39	Oklahoma City
July 17	Jacksonville	49–47	Tampa Bay
July 17	Milwaukee	57–41	Orlando
July 17	Chicago	52–65	Dallas
July 17	Alabama	48–61	Tulsa

Week 17

Date	Home team	Score	Road team
July 23	Spokane	63–49	Chicago
July 24	Tampa Bay	53–29	Alabama
July 24	Orlando	49–21	Oklahoma City
July 24	Tulsa	51–61	Arizona
July 24	Bossier-Shreveport	20–48	Jacksonville
July 24	Iowa	67–75	Milwaukee
July 24	Dallas	41–51	Utah

Week 18

Date	Home team	Score	Road team
July 30	Jacksonville	64–49	Spokane
July 30	Oklahoma City	61–74	Tulsa
July 30	Arizona	47–67	Iowa
July 31	Cleveland	47–54	Milwaukee
July 31	Tampa Bay	60–75	Orlando
July 31	Bossier-Shreveport	56–62	Dallas
July 31	Alabama	68–64	Utah

== Statistics ==
Final Statistics

=== Passing ===
Player	Comp.	Att.	Comp%	Yards	TD's	INT's	Rating
Chris Greisen, MIL	382	563	67.8%	5,146	107	11	128.2
John Dutton, CLE	446	696	64.0%	5,104	100	19	114.3
Brett Dietz, TB	372	572	65.0%	5,034	106	16	120.9
Nick Davila, ARZ	415	617	67.2%	4,858	102	18	118.4
Kyle Rowley, SPO	367	562	65.3%	4,428	100	11	120.8

=== Rushing ===
Player	Car.	Yards	Avg.	TD's	Long
Odie Armstrong, TUL	74	349	4.7	13	37
Nick Hill, ORL	63	284	4.5	15	23
Ryan Vena, IOW	79	275	3.5	22	34
Dan Alexander, ALA	84	209	2.5	26	32
Byron Douzart, BS	42	195	4.6	5	28

=== Receiving ===
Player	Rec.	Yards	Avg.	TD's	Long
Rod Windsor, ARZ	193	2,372	12.3	47	47
Ben Nelson, CLE	151	1,867	12.4	47	46
Anthony Jones, MIL	125	1,810	14.5	42	46
Hank Edwards, TB	115	1,748	15.2	36	45
Donovan Morgan, TUL	123	1,707	13.9	52	45

== Playoffs ==
Conference Semifinals
1	Jacksonville	69
4	Orlando	73
American Conference
2	Tulsa	38
3	Tampa Bay	68
1	Spokane	57
4	Arizona	49
National Conference
2	Milwaukee	64
3	Chicago	54

Conference Championship
4	Orlando	62
3	Tampa Bay	63
1	Spokane	60
2	Milwaukee	57

ArenaBowl XXIII
A3	Tampa Bay	57
N1	Spokane	69

=== Conference semifinals ===
Conference	Date	Kickoff	Away	Home	Final score	Game site	Recap
American	Friday, August 6	8:00 pm EDT	Orlando Predators	Jacksonville Sharks	Orlando, 73–69	Jacksonville Veterans Memorial Arena	
National	Friday, August 6	11:00 pm EDT	Arizona Rattlers	Spokane Shock	Spokane, 57–49	Spokane Veterans Memorial Arena	
American	Saturday, August 7	8:00 pm EDT	Tampa Bay Storm	Tulsa Talons	Tampa Bay, 68–38	BOK Center	
National	Saturday, August 7	8:00 pm EDT	Chicago Rush	Milwaukee Iron	Milwaukee, 64–54	U.S. Cellular Arena	

=== Conference finals ===
Conference	Date	Kickoff	Away	Home	Final score	Game site	Recap
National	Thursday, August 12	8:00 pm EDT	Milwaukee Iron	Spokane Shock	Spokane, 60–57	Spokane Veterans Memorial Arena	
American	Saturday, August 14	7:30 pm EDT	Orlando Predators	Tampa Bay Storm	Tampa Bay, 63–62	St. Pete Times Forum	

=== ArenaBowl XXIII ===
Date	Kickoff	Away	Home	Final score	Game site	Recap
Friday, August 20	8:00 pm EDT	Tampa Bay Storm	Spokane Shock	Spokane, 69–57	Spokane Veterans Memorial Arena	

== All-Arena team ==
Offense
Position	First team	Second team
Quarterback	Chris Greisen, Milwaukee	Brett Dietz, Tampa Bay
Fullback	Dan Alexander, Alabama	Odie Armstrong, Tulsa
Center	Kyle Young, Arizona	Beau Elliot, Chicago
Offensive lineman	Adam Tadisch, Cleveland; Ed Taʻamu, Spokane	Thomas Kaleita, Tampa Bay; Phil Bogle, Dallas
Wide receiver	Rod Windsor, Arizona; Donovan Morgan, Tulsa; Ben Nelson, Cleveland	Anthony Jones, Milwaukee; Aaron Boone, Utah; Huey Whittaker, Utah

Defense
Position	First team	Second team
Defensive lineman	Gabe Nyenhuis, Tulsa; Tim McGill, Tampa Bay; Khreem Smith, Milwaukee	Anttaj Hawthorne, Arizona; Jermaine Smith, Tampa Bay; Anthony Hoke, Cleveland
Middle linebacker	Steve Watson, Tulsa	Cliff Dukes, Tampa Bay
Jack linebacker	DeJuan Alfonzo, Chicago	Jamar Ransom, Tulsa
Defensive back	Rayshaun Kizer, Orlando; Tanner Varner, Iowa; Kenny McEntyre, Orlando	Vince Hill, Alabama; Josh Ferguson, Arizona; Micheaux Robinson, Jacksonville

Special teams
Position	First team	Second team
Kicker	Chris Gould, Chicago	Carlos Martinez, Orlando
