= Sports in North Carolina =

Athletes and sports teams from North Carolina compete across an array of professional and amateur levels of competition, along with athletes who compete at the World and Olympic levels in their respective sport. Major league professional teams based in North Carolina include teams that compete in the National Basketball Association (NBA), National Football League (NFL), National Hockey League (NHL), Major League Soccer (MLS), and National Women's Soccer League (NWSL). The state is also home to NASCAR Cup Series races. At the collegiate and university level, there are several North Carolina schools in various conferences across an array of divisions. North Carolina also has many minor league baseball teams. There are also a number of indoor football, indoor soccer, minor league basketball, and minor league ice hockey teams based throughout the state.

== Major league professional teams ==
Team	League	Metro area	Stadium	Founded
Charlotte Hornets	National Basketball Association	Charlotte	Spectrum Center	1988
Carolina Panthers	National Football League	Charlotte	Bank of America Stadium	1995
Carolina Hurricanes	National Hockey League	Raleigh	Lenovo Center	1972 (based in North Carolina since 1997)
North Carolina Courage	National Women's Soccer League	Cary/Raleigh	First Horizon Stadium at WakeMed Soccer Park	2017
Charlotte FC	Major League Soccer	Charlotte	Bank of America Stadium	2019 (joined in 2022)
Carolina Chaos	Premier Lacrosse League	Charlotte	American Legion Memorial Stadium	2019 (based in North Carolina since 2024)
Carolina Ascent FC	USL Super League	Charlotte	American Legion Memorial Stadium	2023 (started play in 2024)

== Baseball ==
Though it has never been home to a Major League Baseball club, North Carolina is home to numerous minor league and collegiate summer league teams. Many colleges with athletic programs also field baseball teams.

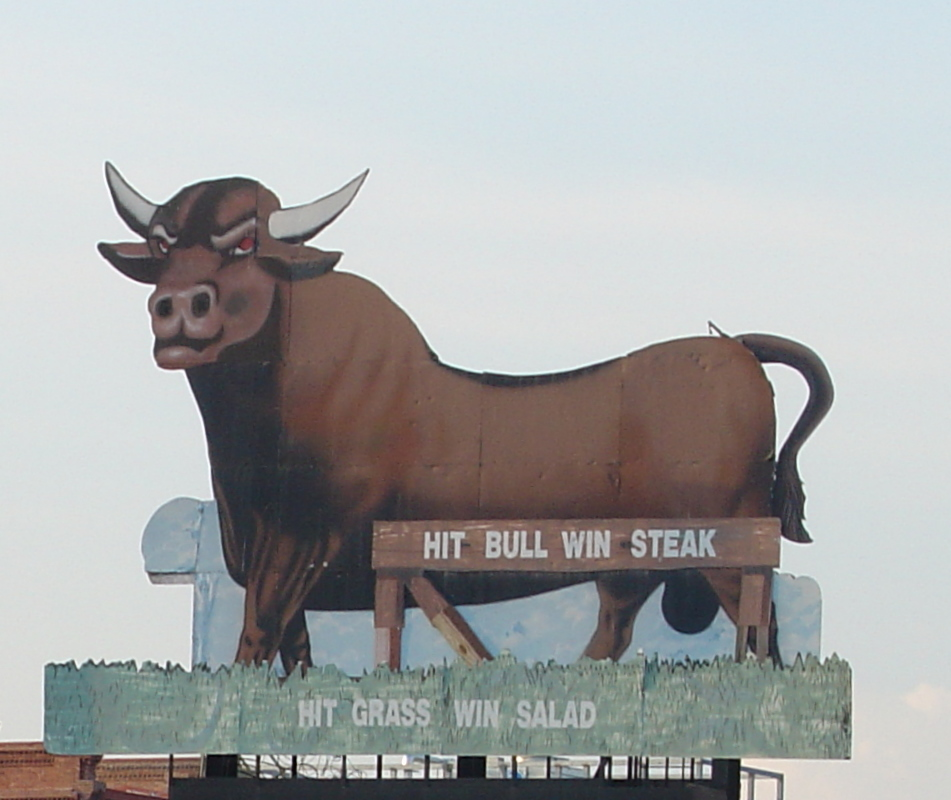
Durham Bulls mascot located at the Durham Bulls Athletic Park

Team	City	Level	League	Founded	MLB affiliation
Charlotte Knights	Charlotte	AAA	International League	1976 (Note: Founded as the AA Charlotte Orioles, which moved to Charlotte from Asheville. The Knights have been part of the AAA International League (known in the 2021 season as Triple-A East) since 1993. From 1989 to 2013, the team played just across the state border in Fort Mill, South Carolina.)	Chicago White Sox
Durham Bulls	Durham	AAA	International League	1902 (Note: The Durham Bulls trace their history to the 1902 Durham Tobacconists. Numerous league and name changes have occurred over the years; the current incarnation of the Bulls has played in the AAA International League since 1998.)	Tampa Bay Rays
Asheville Tourists	Asheville	High A	South Atlantic League	1976 (Note: Numerous teams in Asheville have been known as the Tourists; the previous team moved to Charlotte in 1976 and is now the Charlotte Knights. The current team replaced them in 1976.)	Houston Astros
Greensboro Grasshoppers	Greensboro	High-A	South Atlantic League	1979	Pittsburgh Pirates
Winston-Salem Dash	Winston-Salem	High-A	South Atlantic League	1945 (Note: The Dash trace their history to the 1945 Winston-Salem Cardinals. The current team has been a member of Class A since 1961, and has had their current name since 2009.)	Chicago White Sox
Wilson Warbirds	Wilson	Single-A	Carolina League	2026 (Note: After the 2025 season, the Carolina Mudcats relocated from Zebulon, North Carolina to Wilson, North Carolina, and became the Wilson Warbirds. The team would become the new Single-A affiliate for the Milwaukee Brewers.)	Milwaukee Brewers
Fayetteville Woodpeckers	Fayetteville	Single-A	Carolina League	2017 (Note: Created when the Carolina League expanded by two teams, replacing two teams that had been contracted by the California League. The team played its first two seasons of 2017 and 2018 in Buies Creek as the Buies Creek Astros.)	Houston Astros
Hickory Crawdads	Hickory	Single-A	Carolina League	1977 (Note: Prior to 1993, the Crawdads were located in Gastonia and played under a variety of nicknames.)	Texas Rangers
Kannapolis Cannon Ballers	Kannapolis	Single-A	Carolina League	1995	Chicago White Sox
Gastonia Honey Hunters	Gastonia	Independent	Atlantic League	2021	
High Point Rockers	High Point	Independent	Atlantic League	2018	
Burlington Sock Puppets	Burlington	Collegiate	Appalachian League	2021	
Asheboro ZooKeepers	Asheboro	Collegiate	Coastal Plain League	1999	
Edenton Steamers	Edenton	Collegiate	Tidewater Summer League	1998	
Forest City Owls	Forest City	Collegiate	Coastal Plain League	2007 (Note: The Owls moved to Forest City in 2008. For the previous season, they played in Spartanburg, South Carolina, as the Spartanburg Stingers.)	
Gastonia Grizzlies	Gastonia	Collegiate	Coastal Plain League	2002	
Holly Springs Salamanders	Holly Springs	Collegiate	Coastal Plain League	2015	
Morehead City Marlins	Morehead City	Collegiate	Coastal Plain League	2010	
High Point-Thomasville HiToms	Thomasville	Collegiate	Coastal Plain League	1999	
Wilmington Sharks	Wilmington	Collegiate	Coastal Plain League	1997	
Wilson Tobs	Wilson	Collegiate	Coastal Plain League	1997	

Former Teams
Team	City	Level	League	Founded	MLB Affiliation
Carolina Mudcats	Zebulon	Single-A	Carolina League	1978-2025 (Note: The current incarnation of the Mudcats trace their history to the Kinston Indians, who moved to Zebulon to assume the Mudcats name in 2012. The previous team known as the Mudcats are currently the Pensacola Blue Wahoos, which became a Class AA team in the 2021 Minor League Baseball reorganization.)	Milwaukee Brewers

== Basketball ==
The first successful major professional sports team to be created in North Carolina were the Charlotte Hornets of the National Basketball Association (NBA), which began play in the 1988–89 season.

In 2004, the NBA added the Charlotte Bobcats franchise, two years after the city lost the Hornets to New Orleans. The Charlotte team plays its home games at the Spectrum Center. The Bobcats assumed the Hornets nickname after the conclusion of the 2013–14 season; the New Orleans team had changed its name to the New Orleans Pelicans at the start of that season. By agreement between the NBA, Hornets, and Pelicans, the history and records of the 1988–2002 Hornets were assumed by the current Hornets franchise.

Prior to that, the Carolina Cougars of the American Basketball Association (ABA) played in various North Carolina cites (playing in the ABA for five seasons, 1969–1974). Former Charlotte Bobcats coach Larry Brown started his coaching career as head coach of the Cougars.

=== Professional ===
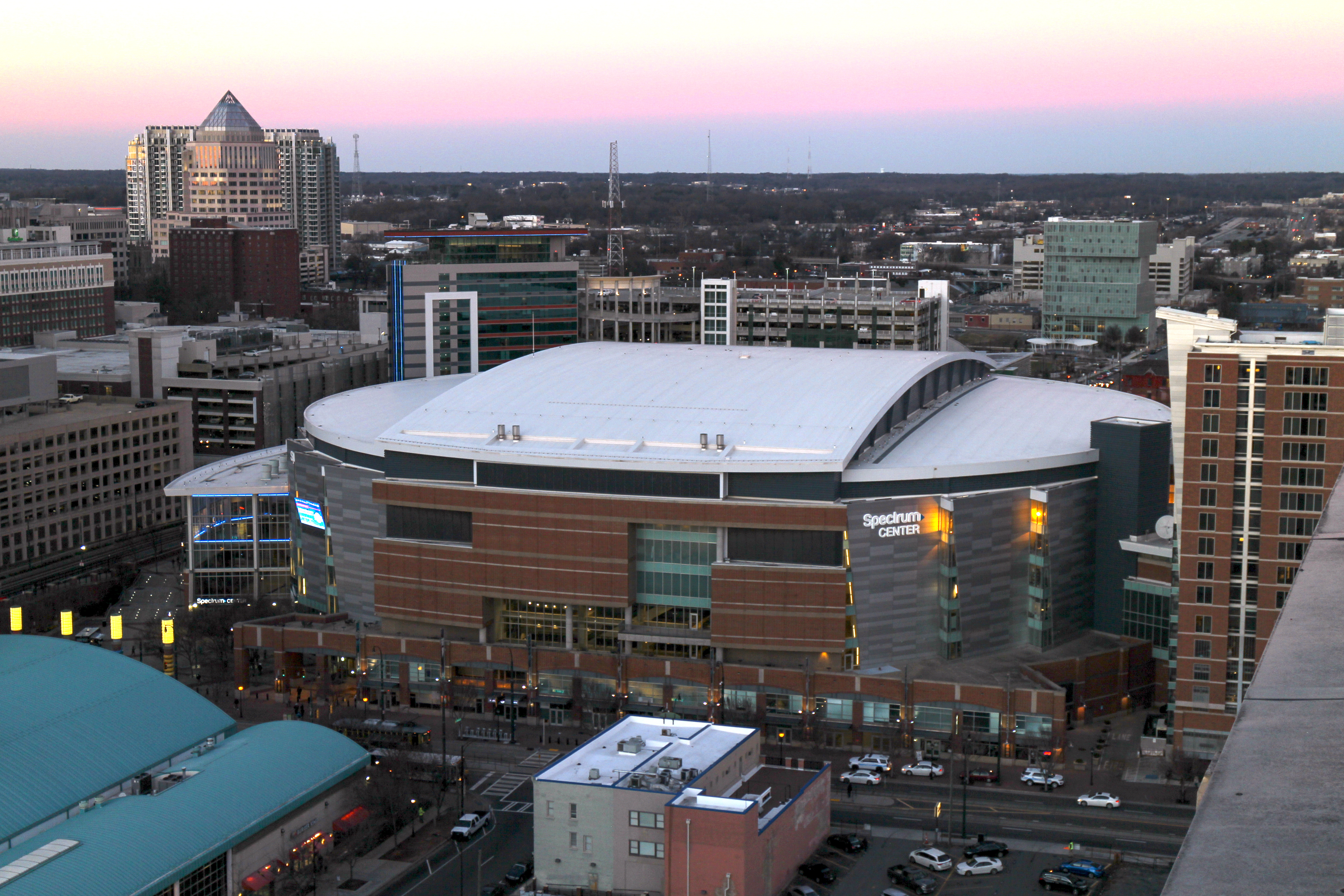
Spectrum Center, home of the Charlotte Hornets of the NBA

North Carolina's first professional basketball team was the American Basketball Association's Carolina Cougars. The Cougars played in North Carolina between 1969 and 1974 and split their games between the Greensboro Coliseum, the original Charlotte Coliseum and Raleigh's Dorton Arena.

Following the Cougars' move to St. Louis it would be fourteen years before professional basketball would return to the Old North State when Charlotte was awarded the NBA's 24th franchise, the Charlotte Hornets. The Hornets played at the Charlotte Coliseum before moving to New Orleans following a bitter dispute between team ownership and the city over funding for a new arena. Two years after the Hornets decamped the Queen City was named as the home of the expansion Charlotte Bobcats who would play two seasons at the Coliseum before taking up residence at a new venue now known as Spectrum Center in Uptown. After the 2012–13 NBA season, New Orleans changed their franchise name to the New Orleans Pelicans. The franchise rights to the Hornets name and logo, plus the history of the original Charlotte Hornets, were given back to the city of Charlotte after the 2013–14 NBA season, at the same time the Charlotte Bobcats became the Charlotte Hornets. North Carolina Tar Heels legend Michael Jordan is the majority owner of the Hornets.

In 2016, Greensboro was awarded the Hornets' NBA G League team, the Greensboro Swarm. The Swarm won their first NBA G League championship in 2026.

=== College ===
North Carolina is home to what some consider the best rivalry in American sports, North Carolina vs. Duke. Chapel Hill (UNC) and Durham (Duke) are only 8 miles apart. This rivalry reaches its climax in basketball but often spills over to other sports. North Carolina State and Wake Forest are also considered major rivals of the Blue Devils and Tar Heels, for more on the four-way rivalry see Tobacco Road.

Other Division I teams in the state include the Appalachian State Mountaineers, Campbell Fighting Camels, Charlotte 49ers, Davidson Wildcats, East Carolina Pirates, Elon Phoenix, Gardner–Webb Runnin' Bulldogs, High Point Panthers, North Carolina A&T Aggies, North Carolina Central Eagles, Queens Royals, UNC Asheville Bulldogs, UNC Greensboro Spartans, UNC Wilmington Seahawks, and Western Carolina Catamounts.

Although North Carolina did not have a major-league professional sports franchise until the 1980s, the state has long been known as a hotbed of college basketball. Since the formation of the Atlantic Coast Conference (ACC) in 1953, the conference's North Carolina member schools have excelled in conference play. The University of North Carolina at Chapel Hill (UNC), Duke University, and North Carolina State University are all located within 25 miles (40 km) of one another, creating fierce rivalries. Wake Forest University, another ACC member, was located in the town of Wake Forest, also within the Raleigh–Durham area, until its 1956 move to Winston-Salem, less than 100 miles (160 km) to the west of these schools. UNC has won six NCAA national championships in men's basketball (1957, 1982, 1993, 2005, 2009, 2017) and one in women's basketball (1994). Duke has won five NCAA men's championships (1991, 1992, 2001, 2010, 2015), and NC State has won two (1974 and 1983). The Duke-UNC basketball rivalry has been called one of the best rivalries in sports and the two schools are often contenders for the national title. In addition to the ACC schools, the University of North Carolina at Charlotte went to the NCAA's Final Four in 1977, and Davidson College near Charlotte went to the NCAA's "Elite Eight" in 1968, 1969, and 2008.

North Carolina schools have also won multiple NCAA Division II basketball national championships. In 1967, Winston-Salem State University, led by future NBA star Earl Monroe and coached by the legendary Clarence "Big House" Gaines, was the first school in the state to win the Division II championship. In 1989, North Carolina Central University, which is now a Division I member, brought the title to the state a second time; winning the championship game by 27 points, which remains the largest margin of victory in its history. And in 2007, Barton College in Wilson returned the title to the state a third time.

North Carolina has a large number of historically black colleges and universities (HBCUs) with long athletic traditions and deep fan bases as well. Ten HBCUs participate in NCAA college sports in North Carolina, with all but North Carolina A&T State University (the largest HBCU in the U.S.) playing in either the Division II Central Intercollegiate Athletic Association (CIAA) or the Division I Mid-Eastern Athletic Conference (MEAC). A&T had long been a MEAC member, but changed conferences twice in the 2020s, first to the Big South Conference in 2021 and then the Coastal Athletic Association in 2022 (though the football team did not join the CAA's football conference (Note: The CAA football conference, branded as CAA Football, is administered by the multi-sports CAA but is a legally separate entity.) until 2023). Both the CIAA Men's Basketball Tournament and MEAC men's basketball tournament have been held numerous times in cities across North Carolina. The Aggie-Eagle rivalry between A&T and North Carolina Central University (the state's second-largest HBCU) remains a fierce rivalry across numerous sports and has followed the teams through many decades and across several league moves.

== Football ==
=== History of North Carolina football ===
The first major professional sports league football team in North Carolina came in 1974, when the New York Stars of the World Football League was relocated to Charlotte in the middle of the season and renamed to the Charlotte Hornets (although the team was referred to as the Charlotte Stars for the first game in Charlotte). The National Football League (NFL) is represented by the Carolina Panthers, who began play in 1995, and call Charlotte's Bank of America Stadium home. North Carolina was also home to the Charlotte Rage and the Carolina Cobras of the Arena Football League.

=== College ===
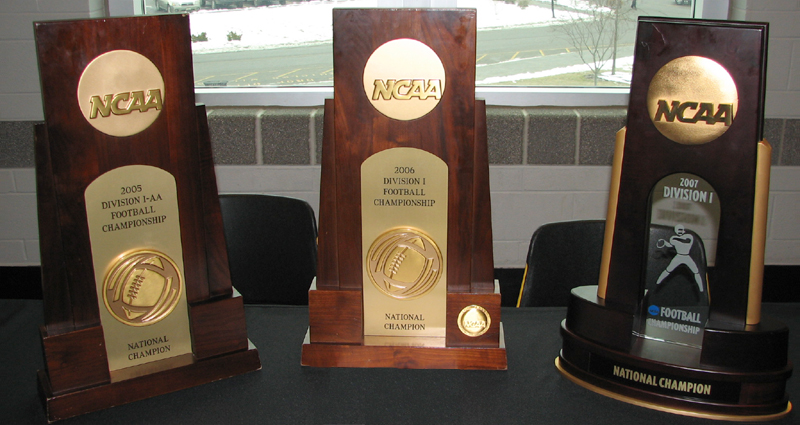
Appalachian State Football National Championship trophies

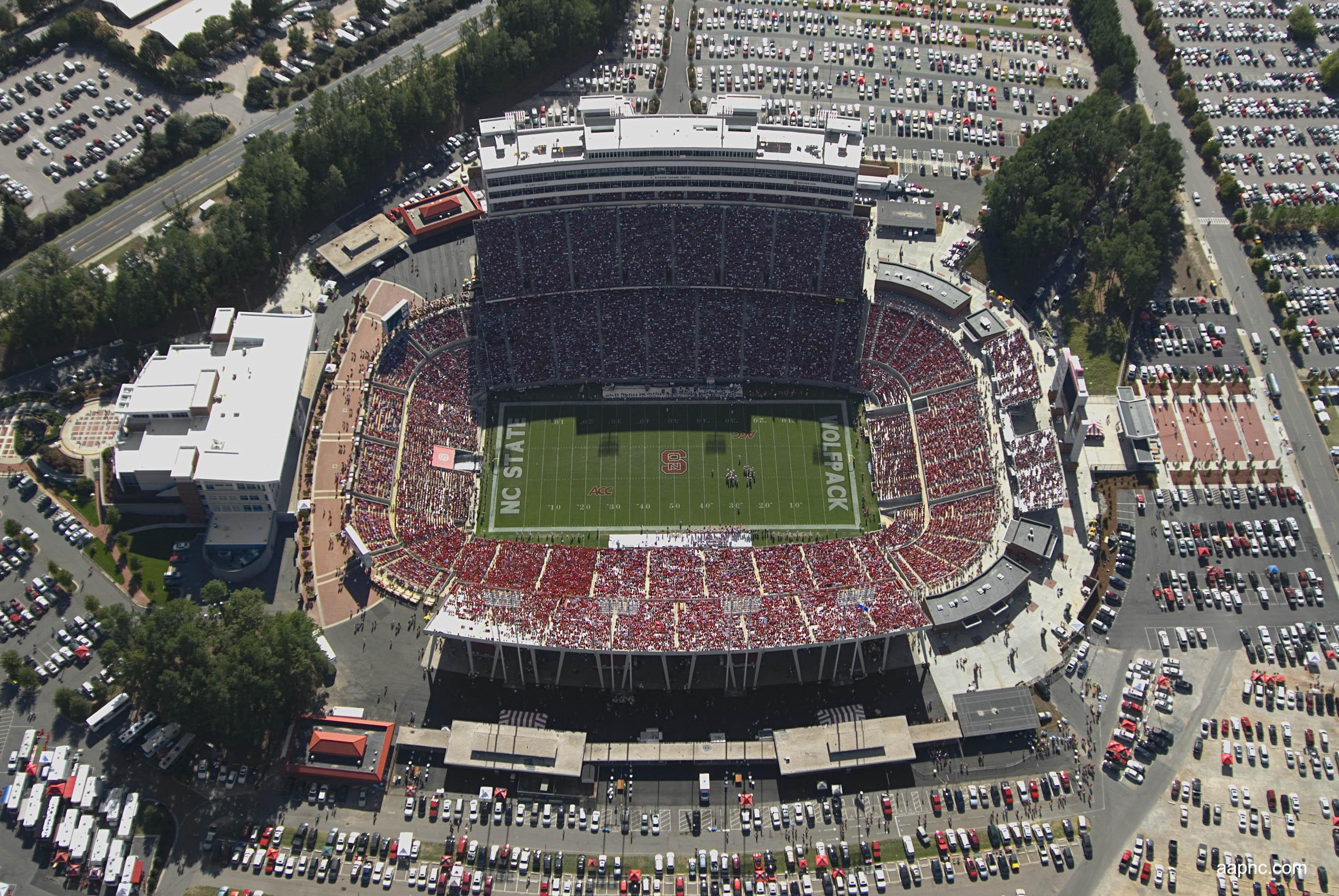
Carter–Finley Stadium, home football stadium for the NC State Wolfpack football team

College football is very popular in North Carolina, with many colleges fielding teams. Only two states have more universities fielding teams at the NCAA's highest level, Division I Football Bowl Subdivision (FBS). North Carolina has seven FBS teams in all—the North Carolina Tar Heels, NC State Wolfpack, Duke Blue Devils, Wake Forest Demon Deacons, East Carolina Pirates, Appalachian State Mountaineers, and Charlotte 49ers. An additional seven field teams in Division I Football Championship Subdivision (FCS), as well as many schools at the Division II and III levels. Before moving to FBS and the Sun Belt Conference in 2014, Appalachian State won FCS national titles in 2005, 2006 and 2007.

Although basketball remains the dominant college sport in North Carolina, several schools have also enjoyed success in football and other sports. Wake Forest has also enjoyed substantial success in football; in 2006 they won the Atlantic Coast Conference (ACC) football championship and participated in the 2007 Orange Bowl in Miami. This was the first major bowl berth for a North Carolina–based ACC team since Duke defeated Arkansas in the 1961 Cotton Bowl Classic. East Carolina University also enjoys much success in football. Located in Greenville the Pirates won both the 2008 and 2009 Conference USA Football Championship and have a large and passionate fan base. The East Carolina Pirates were the first back-to-back C-USA champions since divisional play was started in 2005. The Pirates played in the AutoZone Liberty Bowl for a second consecutive year on January 2, 2010. As part of the early-2010s NCAA conference realignment, East Carolina joined the American Athletic Conference in 2014. Elon University made 4 trips to the NAIA National Championship in football game winning back to back championships in 1980 and 1981, and has since moved to the NCAA's second-tier Division I FCS and the Colonial Athletic Association. Lenoir-Rhyne University won the 1960 NAIA National Championship in football, and were losing finalists in the NCAA Division II championship in 2013. The Charlotte 49ers, which are the sports teams affiliated with the University of North Carolina at Charlotte, first fielded a football team and joined Division I FBS for Conference USA in 2015, participated in their first bowl game in 2019. Charlotte will join East Carolina in The American in 2023. Appalachian State University, Elon University, Western Carolina University and North Carolina A&T State University have all made trips to the NCAA Football Championship Subdivision championship playoffs. Appalachian State has since moved to Division I FBS and the Sun Belt Conference. Western Carolina has made one trip to this championship game, while Appalachian State became the first school to win the championship three years in a row (2005–2007). After moving to FBS, Appalachian State won bowl games in each of its first six seasons of bowl eligibility (2015–2020), the most successful such run by any ream that made the jump from FCS to FBS.

Charlotte is also host to the ACC Championship Game and the Duke's Mayo Bowl; both are FBS postseason games.

=== National Football League ===
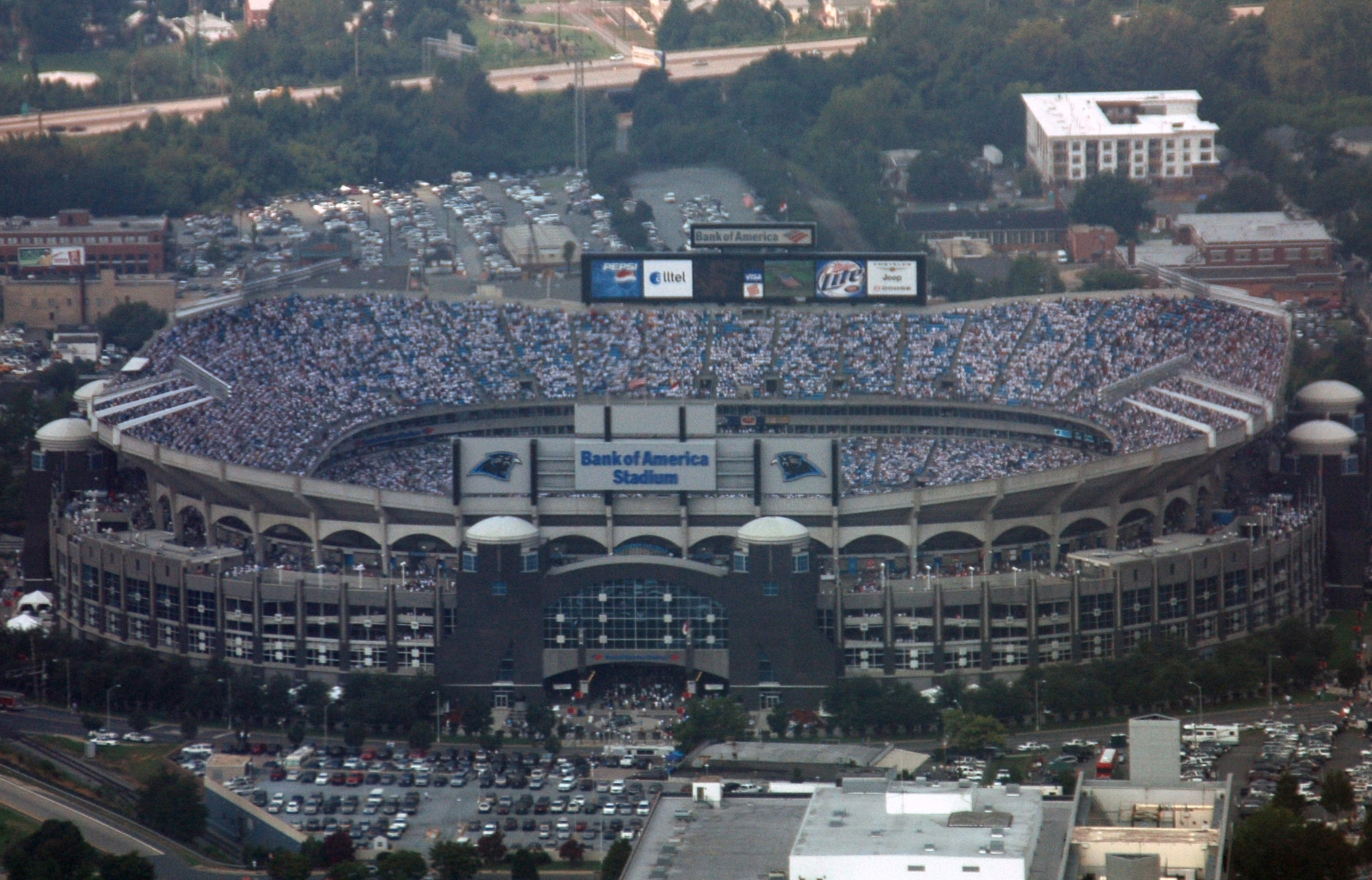
Bank of America Stadium, home of the NFL's Carolina Panthers

North Carolina is home to the Carolina Panthers of the National Football League (NFL) who play their home games at the 75,000-seat Bank of America Stadium in Uptown Charlotte. The Panthers played their first season in 1995 at Memorial Stadium on the campus of Clemson University in neighboring South Carolina. On February 1, 2004, the Panthers played in Super Bowl XXXVIII, and on February 7, 2016, they played in Super Bowl 50. The Panthers were not North Carolina's first foray into professional football though; in the mid-1970s, the Hornets of the World Football League called American Legion Memorial Stadium in Charlotte home.

Bank of America Stadium, home stadium for the NFL's Carolina Panthers, opened in 1996 and has been the home site for the Panthers since. Since the Panthers first season in 1995, they have won six division championships, two National Football Conference championships and made two Super Bowl appearances. In 2015, quarterback Cam Newton became the first Carolina Panther to win the NFL Most Valuable Player Award. Along with the New England Patriots, it is one of two NFL teams to represent multiple states.

== Golf ==
Pinehurst Resort, a world-famous golf resort, is located in the Sandhills and has played host to several major golf championships including the United States Open Championship, the PGA Championship, and the Ryder Cup Matches. In 2014 Pinehurst's most famous course, No. 2, made history by becoming the first course to host both the men's and women's U.S. Opens in the same year.

Several professional tours make stops in North Carolina every year, including the EGolf Professional Tour (formerly the Tarheel Tour) which is based in Charlotte. Annual PGA Tour stops in the state are the Wells Fargo Championship at the Quail Hollow Club in Charlotte, and the Wyndham Championship which has alternated between several course in Greensboro. The second-tier Korn Ferry Tour visits Raleigh every year for the Rex Hospital Open.

== Ice hockey ==
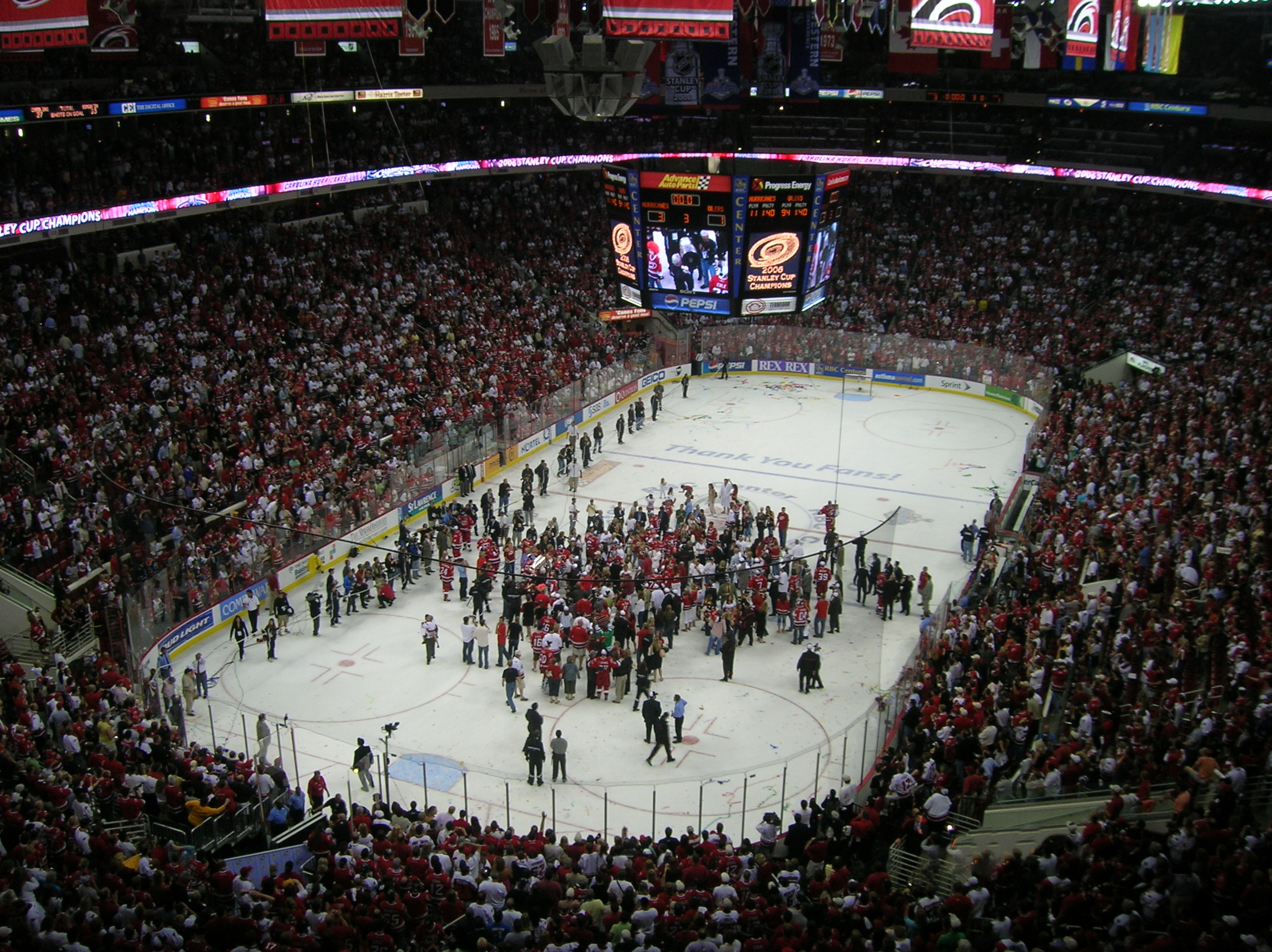
Carolina Hurricanes Stanley Cup awards ceremony at the RBC Center (now Lenovo Center)

In 1997, the Carolina Hurricanes of the National Hockey League (NHL) moved from Hartford, Connecticut (as the Hartford Whalers) to the state. The team played their games at the Greensboro Coliseum for their first two seasons in North Carolina before moving to their current home at the Entertainment and Sports Arena, later RBC Center, then PNC Arena, and now Lenovo Center, in Raleigh. The Hurricanes won the 2006 Stanley Cup, becoming the first major professional sports team from North Carolina to win their sport's highest championship. After a decade without post-season appearances, and a lack of success, the Hurricanes began to turn around under new ownership. In 2026, they won their second Stanley Cup, twenty years after winning their first one. The franchise hosted the team's first outdoor game at Carter-Finley Stadium on February 18, 2023, as a part of the NHL Stadium Series.

In 2010, the Albany River Rats, the American Hockey League affiliate of the Hurricanes, relocated to Charlotte and became the Charlotte Checkers, assuming the name from the former ECHL team that had played in the city since 1995. The Charlotte Checkers play their home games at Bojangles' Coliseum in uptown Charlotte. The Checkers' affiliation with the Hurricanes ended in 2020, and the team became the affiliate of the Florida Panthers.

Fayetteville also has an ice hockey team, the Fayetteville Marksmen of the Southern Professional Hockey League.

Winston-Salem became the home of a new Carolina Thunderbirds team in the Federal Prospects Hockey League in the 2017–18 season. The new team is named after the former Carolina Thunderbirds of the ECHL.

In 2024, Greensboro was awarded with another ECHL team, the Greensboro Gargoyles for 2025–25 season.

== Motorsports ==
North Carolina is a center in American motorsports, with more than 80% of NASCAR racing teams and related industries located in the Piedmont region. Stock car racing is the official sport of the state.

A new drag strip, called Zmax Dragway, has been built on the same grounds as the speedway. It is currently the only drag strip in the U.S. to hold 4-wide drag racing events (as opposed to the traditional 2-wide drag races held at other tracks). The NHRA holds one to two national events there each year.

In off-road motorcycle racing, the Grand National Cross Country series makes three stops in North Carolina, Morganton, Wilkesboro and Yadkinville; the only other state to host two GNCC events is Ohio.

Although no races of this category are presently being held in North Carolina, it is home to the only current American Formula One team Haas F1 Team, founded and owned by Gene Haas, based out of Kannapolis.

=== Stars ===
The NASCAR Hall of Fame, located in Charlotte, opened on May 11, 2010. Many of NASCAR's most famous driver dynasties, the Pettys, Earnhardts, Allisons, Jarretts and Waltrips all live within an hour's drive of Charlotte.

Two families from North Carolina, the Pettys and the Earnhardts, have had several members that achieved varying levels of success in NASCAR competitions and are a source of pride for Carolinians and Southerners in general.

Lee Petty of Randleman started his family's association with the sport. His son, Richard of Level Cross holds the all-time record for wins (200) in the NASCAR Cup Series and was the first person to win 7 Cup championships. Richard's son Kyle (born in Randleman) and grandson Adam (born in High Point) were also drivers. Adam Petty was killed when his car crashed during a practice at New Hampshire International Speedway in Loudon, New Hampshire.

The Earnhardt family of Kannapolis began its association with NASCAR with Ralph Earnhardt. His son Dale would become a major star in the sport, winning 76 Cup series races and tying Richard Petty's record of 7 championships before his death on the final lap of the 2001 Daytona 500. Dale's son Dale Jr. was also highly successful and was considered the face of NASCAR until his retirement from racing after the 2017 season. Kerry Earnhardt, another son of the elder Dale Earnhardt, and his sons Bobby and Jeffrey have also competed in various NASCAR series.

Outside of the Earnhardt and Petty clans North Carolina is home to many other current and former NASCAR drivers such as Junior Johnson (Wilkes County), Richard Childress (Winston-Salem), Ned and Dale Jarrett (both Newton), Andy Petree (Hickory), Rick Hendrick (Warrenton), Layne and Scott Riggs (both Durham)

=== Tracks ===
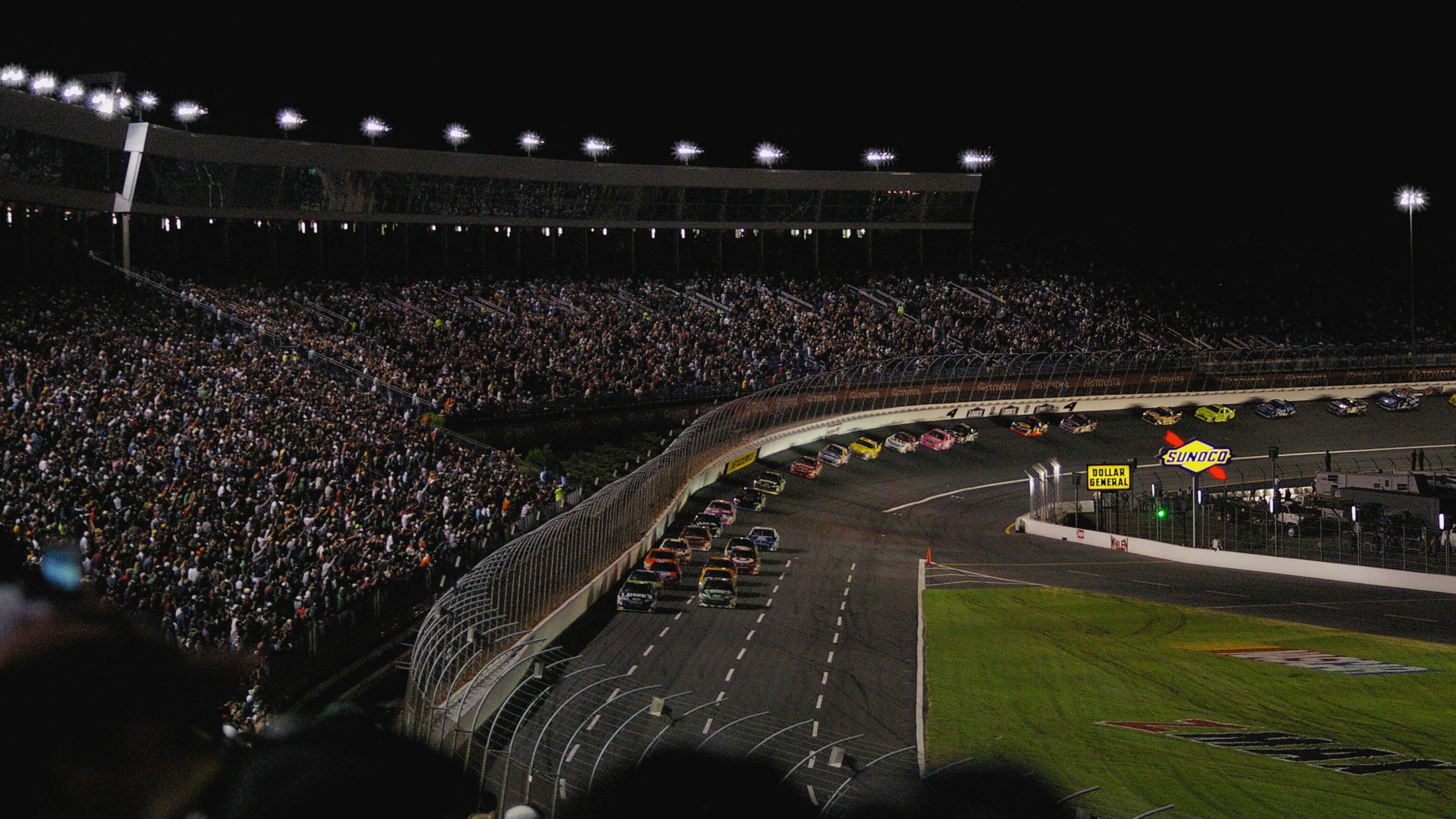
Charlotte Motor Speedway at night

Once a major part of the NASCAR circuit, North Carolina now only has one track on the schedule that hosts a points-paying race, Charlotte. The 167,000-seat Charlotte track is located in Concord, and hosts three Cup Series events every season, including the NASCAR Sprint All-Star Race (formerly The Winston). Charlotte also hosts NASCAR's longest race, the Coca-Cola 600, every May. During race weeks Concord balloons from its normal population of just under 56,000 to over 300,000.

Tracks that formerly hosted points-paying Cup Series events include North Wilkesboro Speedway, Rockingham Speedway, and Metrolina Speedway. North Wilkesboro returned to the Cup Series schedule in 2023, although doing so with the NASCAR All-Star Race, an exhibition event that does not award points toward the Cup championship.

== Soccer ==
Charlotte was awarded a Major League Soccer franchise in 2019, and the team began play as Charlotte FC in 2022. The state is also home to two top-level women's teams. The most established is the North Carolina Courage of the National Women's Soccer League, which plays in Cary. The owner of North Carolina FC, then a member of the men's Division II North American Soccer League but now in the second-level USL Championship, bought the NWSL franchise rights of the Western New York Flash after the 2016 season. The NWSL team was then relocated from Rochester, New York, to Cary, moving to NCFC's home of WakeMed Soccer Park. The Courage won the 2022 NWSL Challenge Cup. A competing top-level women's league, the USL Super League, began play in 2024 with Carolina Ascent FC from Charlotte as one of its eight inaugural teams. Ascent is the successor to the Charlotte Independence women's team, which played in the USL W League in 2022 and 2023.

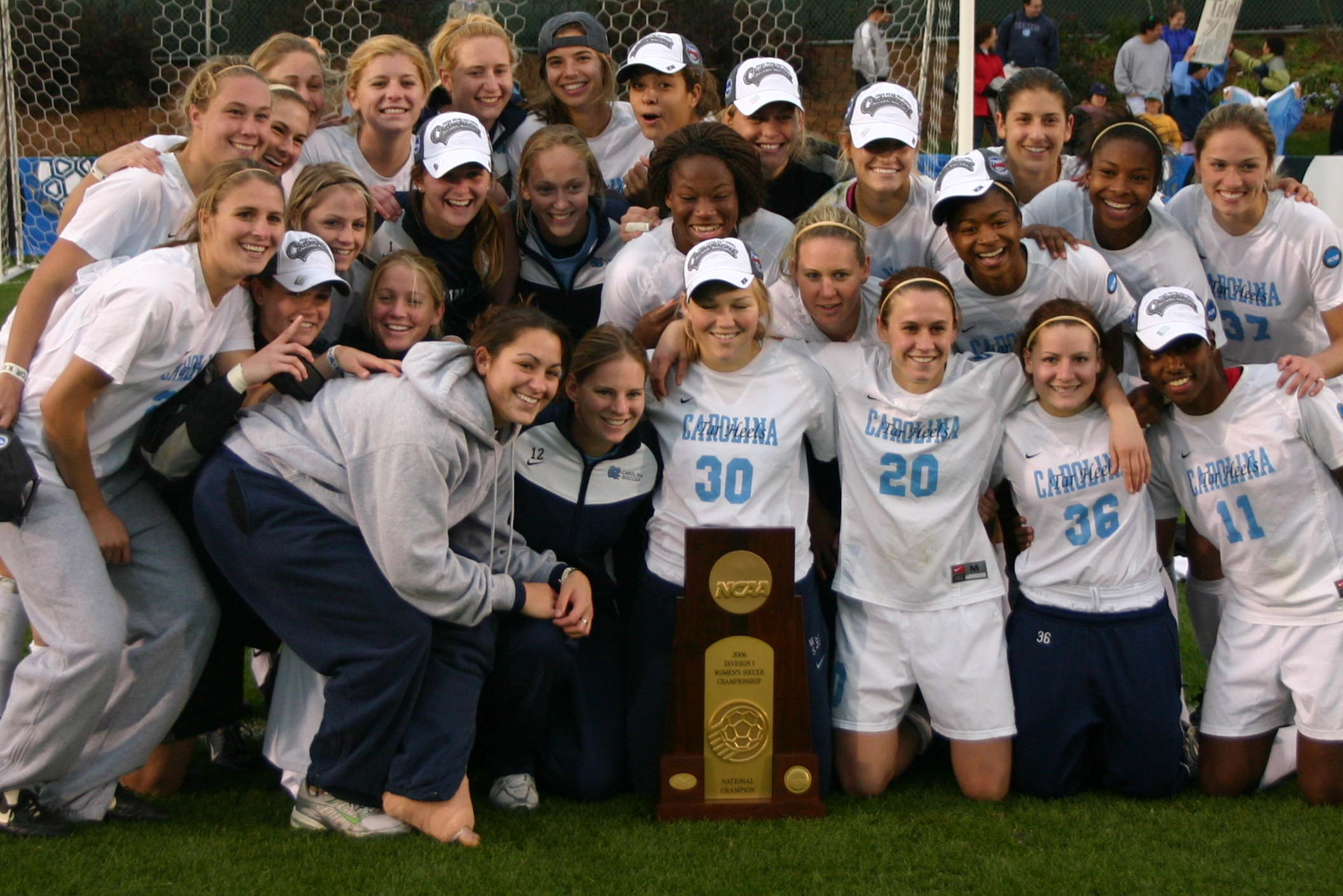
The Tar Heels with the 2006 Women's College Cup

North Carolina is also home to several lower-division professional teams. North Carolina FC (formerly the Carolina RailHawks) plays in the USL Championship, having returned to that league in 2024 after having voluntarily dropped to USL League One (USL1) prior to the 2021 season. The Charlotte Independence had played in the USL Championship through the 2021 season, but dropped to USL1 due to the impending launch of Charlotte FC. Two North Carolina-based teams now play in MLS Next Pro. Crown Legacy FC started play in 2023 as the reserve side for Charlotte FC, and the High Point-based Carolina Core FC, one of Next Pro's few clubs without an MLS affiliation, began play in 2024. Asheville City SC plays in the National Premier Soccer League. Additionally the Charlotte Eagles, the North Carolina Fusion U23 of Greensboro, and Tobacco Road FC of Durham play in USL League Two (formerly the Premier Development League, or PDL). The Eagles played in the USL Championship when it was called the USL Professional Division, but chose to relegate themselves to the PDL after the 2014 season, transferring their franchise rights to local interests that launched the Independence for the 2015 season. The Hammerheads relegated themselves from the USL to the PDL after the 2016 season. Charlotte and Greensboro both have women's teams in the USL W-League.

As with other sports, college soccer is important in North Carolina. The North Carolina Tar Heels have dominated women's college soccer on a national level, laying claim to the lion's share of all Division I national championships in the sport. The Heels have also been successful in men's soccer, winning national and conference champions. Duke and Wake Forest have also won national soccer championships. In 2011, UNC topped the Charlotte 49ers in an all-North Carolina affair to claim the men's national championship.

Charlotte has also hosted several CONCACAF Gold Cup matches at Bank of America Stadium.

== Swimming ==
Over the last two decades, North Carolina has become a rising power in the world of professional and amateur swimming. As with many other components of North Carolina's sport culture, this rise began on the college campuses of the Old North State. North Carolina State University, Duke University, and the University of North Carolina at Chapel Hill all field varsity swimming and diving teams at the Division I level. The men's program at NC State has enjoyed the most success, bringing home 25 Atlantic Coast Conference Championships, more than any other ACC team.

NC State's men have also boasted 75 All-Americans and 9 Olympians, including Cullen Jones, the first African-American world record holder in swimming and gold medalist at the 2008 Beijing Games in the men's 4 × 100 meter freestyle relay. The women's team has won two ACC Championships and sent one athlete to the Olympics. Recently, Wolfpack Diver Kristen Davies won the NCAA title in platform diving. The Wolfpack program did not perform as well as in the past during the 2000s; however, the arrival of new head coach Braden Holloway has made an immediate impact on the program. In two seasons, Holloway has guided the Pack back to top 25 national rankings and relevance in the ACC. The Tar Heels, meanwhile, have won several conference titles as well. The University of North Carolina at Wilmington has won several Colonial Athletic Association titles.

In 2008, former Auburn University head swim coach David Marsh arrived to take the helm of USA Swimming's first center of excellence at SwimMAC Carolina (formerly Mecklenburg Aquatic Club) in Charlotte. Under his guidance, SwimMAC has been named USA Swimming's club of the year and is widely regarded as one of the best programs in the country. In 2012, SwimMAC's "Team Elite", personally coached by Marsh, produced five Olympians: Nick Thoman, Micah Lawrence, Kara Lynn Joyce, Davis Tarwater, and Cullen Jones. Many other Team Elite members have made the US National team. Winston-Salem native Kathleen Baker won silver in the Women's 100 meter backstroke and gold in the Women's 4 × 100 meter medley relay at the 2016 Summer Olympics in Rio de Janeiro.

The Greensboro Coliseum Complex opened the 78,000 square-foot Greensboro Aquatic Center in August 2011, with seating for 2,500 people. The venue hosted the 2012 U.S. Masters Swimming Spring National Championship.

In addition to the Greensboro Aquatic Center, North Carolina boasts a large variety of competition swimming & diving centers. This includes the Triangle Aquatic Center, Koury Natatorium, Taishoff Aquatics Pavilion, Mecklenberg County Aquatic Center, and the Willis R. Casey Aquatic Center. In 2014, USA swimming ranked Raleigh & Durham as the 3rd best swimming city in the United States.

== Other sports ==
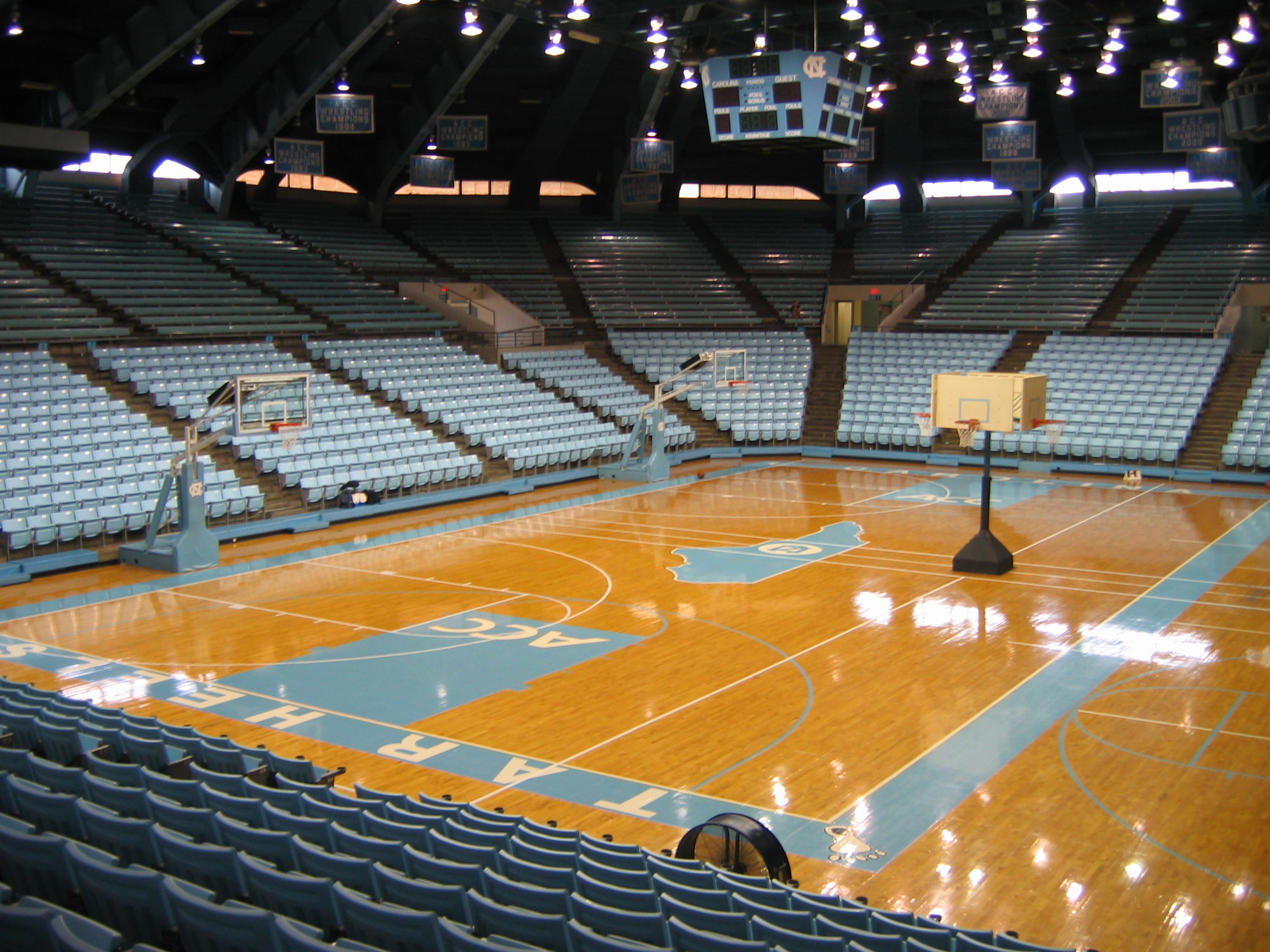
Carmichael Arena; home of UNC women's basketball, volleyball, gymnastics, and men's wrestling

In recent years lacrosse has experienced a period of steady growth in North Carolina that has seen high schools in the three main metropolitan areas add the sport to their programs, this growth culminated in Charlotte being awarded a Major League Lacrosse expansion team named the Charlotte Hounds, the first professional outdoor lacrosse team in the South. An indoor lacrosse team, Charlotte Copperheads, played in the Professional Lacrosse League's only season in 2012. Duke and North Carolina field lacrosse teams for both sexes; both of the schools' men's teams have won national championships—North Carolina had been the westernmost school to win the men's national championship until Denver won the 2015 title—and the North Carolina women have also won national championships. The Tar Heels won both the men's and women's titles in 2016. Full Division I members High Point and Queens, plus five schools in the Division II Conference Carolinas, also play lacrosse.

Rugby union is seeing a major increase in popularity in North Carolina and the Southeastern United States, with the NCYRU's JV and Varsity all-star squads winning the regional southeast RAST (Rugby All Star Tournament) in 2014, with both teams undefeated in the tournament.

Softball is popular at the collegiate, scholastic, and recreational levels. North Carolina and NC State field women's gymnastics teams in the East Atlantic Gymnastics League, which both have each won four times. The state is home to nine NCAA Women's Field Hockey Championship titles with North Carolina winning six and Wake Forest winning three.

From the 1930s to the early 1990s, the Mid Atlantic Championship Wrestling professional wrestling promotion, under the Crockett family, operated almost entirely out of Charlotte. Mid Atlantic was a long-time member of the National Wrestling Alliance and many of their top stars appeared on national television on NWA and later WCW events. Many retired or still-current wrestlers live in the Charlotte/Lake Norman area, including Ric Flair, his daughter Ashley (who performs as Charlotte Flair), Ricky Steamboat, Matt and Jeff Hardy, Stan Lane, Shannon Moore and R-Truth. Also, the former chairman of WWE, Vince McMahon, was born in Pinehurst, attended East Carolina University, and was married in New Bern.

North Carolina has become a hotbed for professional bull riding (PBR). It is home to several professional stock contractors and bull owners. The Southern Extreme Bull Riding Association SEBRA headquarters are located in Archdale.

Volleyball is a very popular sport at the recreational level and most colleges field women's teams while a few, notably schools in Conference Carolinas, field men's teams.

Ultimate in North Carolina is increasingly popular with youth, collegiate, club, and professional teams all competitive at the national level.

== Miscellany ==
The North Carolina Sports Hall of Fame was established in February 1963, with the support of the Charlotte Chamber of Commerce, "to honor those persons who by excellence of their activities in or connected with the world of sports have brought recognition and esteem to themselves and to the State of North Carolina." The Hall of Fame inducted its first five members in December of that year.

=== List of NCAA Division I schools ===
Institution	Nickname	Location	Established	Conference	School type	Undergraduate Enrollment	Varsity sports
Appalachian State	Mountaineers	Boone	1899	Sun Belt (Note: Appalachian State competes in the Southern Conference in men's wrestling and the Mid-American Conference in field hockey.)	Public (UNC)	13,447	18
Campbell	Fighting Camels	Buies Creek	1887	CAA (Note: The CAA football league, branded as CAA Football, is legally a separate entity from the all-sports CAA.) (Note: Campbell men's wrestling competes in the Southern Conference.)	Private (Baptist)	2,843	19
Davidson	Wildcats	Davidson	1837	A-10 (Note: Davidson football competes in the Pioneer Football League, and the school's men's wrestling program competes in the Southern Conference.)	Private (Presbyterian)	1,700	21
Duke	Blue Devils	Durham	1838	ACC	Private	6,244	26
East Carolina	Pirates	Greenville	1907	American	Public (UNC)	17,728	19
Elon	Phoenix	Elon	1889	CAA	Private (United Church of Christ)	4,849	16
Gardner–Webb	Runnin' Bulldogs	Boiling Springs	1905	Big South (Note: Gardner–Webb football plays in the OVC–Big South Football Association, a football-only partnership between the Big South and the Ohio Valley Conference. It is a member of the Atlantic Sun Conference for men's and women's swimming.)	Private (Baptist)	~4,000	19
High Point	Panthers	High Point	1924	Big South (Note: High Point is a member of the Atlantic 10 Conference for men's lacrosse and the Mid-American Conference for women's rowing.)	Private (Methodist)	2,699	14
North Carolina A&T	Aggies	Greensboro	1891	CAA	Public (UNC)	9,735	11
North Carolina Central	Eagles	Durham	1910	MEAC (Note: North Carolina Central men's and women's golf teams compete in the NEC (historically known as the Northeast Conference).)	Public (UNC)	8,600	16
North Carolina State	Wolfpack	Raleigh	1887	ACC (Note: The NC State rifle team competes in the Great America Rifle Conference.)	Public (UNC)	23,730	26
Queens	Royals	Charlotte	1857	ASUN (Note: Queens is an independent in women's field hockey, and a member of the Midwestern Intercollegiate Volleyball Association in men's volleyball.)	Private (Presbyterian)	2,463	30 (Note: Includes the following sports not recognized by the NCAA: cheerleading (coed), dance team (all-female), men's rugby, and men's triathlon.)
UNC Chapel Hill (North Carolina)	Tar Heels	Chapel Hill	1789	ACC	Public (UNC)	16,764	28
UNC Charlotte (Charlotte)	49ers	Charlotte	1946	American	Public (UNC)	16,584	12
UNC Greensboro	Spartans	Greensboro	1891	SoCon	Public (UNC)	12,291	16
UNC Wilmington (UNCW)	Seahawks	Wilmington	1947	CAA (Note: Beach volleyball competes in the Sun Belt Conference.)	Public (UNC)	10,581	19
Wake Forest	Demon Deacons	Winston-Salem	1834	ACC	Private (Baptist)	4,231	18
Western Carolina	Catamounts	Cullowhee	1889	SoCon	Public (UNC)	8,891	13

=== Team list ===
Sport	Team	League
Baseball	Asheville Tourists	Minor League Baseball (High-A); South Atlantic League
Baseball	Carolina Mudcats	Minor League Baseball (Single-A); Carolina League
Baseball	Charlotte Knights	Minor League Baseball (AAA); International League
Baseball	Durham Bulls	Minor League Baseball (AAA); International League
Baseball	Fayetteville Woodpeckers	Minor League Baseball (Single-A); Carolina League
Baseball	Greensboro Grasshoppers	Minor League Baseball (High-A); South Atlantic League
Baseball	Hickory Crawdads	Minor League Baseball (Single-A); Carolina League
Baseball	Kannapolis Cannon Ballers	Minor League Baseball (Single-A); Carolina League
Baseball	Wilson Warbirds	Minor League Baseball (Single-A); Carolina League
Baseball	Winston-Salem Dash	Minor League Baseball (High-A); South Atlantic League
Baseball	Down East Bird Dawgs	Independent; Frontier League
Baseball	Gastonia Ghost Peppers	Independent; Atlantic League
Baseball	High Point Rockers	Independent; Atlantic League
Baseball	Burlington Sock Puppets	Wood-Bat Collegiate Summer League; Appalachian League
Baseball	Edenton Steamers	Wood-Bat Collegiate Summer League; Coastal Plain League
Baseball	Fayetteville Swampdogs	Wood-Bat Collegiate Summer League; Coastal Plain League
Baseball	Morehead City Marlins	Wood-Bat Collegiate Summer League; Coastal Plain League
Baseball	Wilmington Sharks	Wood-Bat Collegiate Summer League; Coastal Plain League
Baseball	Wilson Tobs	Wood-Bat Collegiate Summer League; Coastal Plain League
Baseball	Asheboro Copperheads	Wood-Bat Collegiate Summer League; Coastal Plain League
Baseball	Forest City Owls	Wood-Bat Collegiate Summer League; Coastal Plain League
Baseball	Gastonia Grizzlies	Wood-Bat Collegiate Summer League; Coastal Plain League
Baseball	Thomasville Hi-Toms	Wood-Bat Collegiate Summer League; Coastal Plain League
Basketball	Charlotte Hornets	National Basketball Association
Basketball	Greensboro Swarm	NBA G League
Basketball	Fayetteville Flight	American Basketball Association
Basketball	Raleigh Rough Riders	Continental Basketball League
Basketball	Gastonia Gamers	World Basketball Association
Basketball	Wilmington Sea Dawgs	Tobacco Road Basketball League
Basketball	Big Texas	Tobacco Road Basketball League
Basketball	Carolina Gladiators	Tobacco Road Basketball League
Basketball	Cary Invasion	Tobacco Road Basketball League
Basketball	Fayetteville Crossover	Tobacco Road Basketball League
Basketball	Greensboro Cobras	Tobacco Road Basketball League
Basketball	Johnston County Nighthawks	Tobacco Road Basketball League
Basketball	Queen City Express	Tobacco Road Basketball League
Basketball	Team HoopForLyfe	Tobacco Road Basketball League
Basketball	Blue Ridge Bison	Tobacco Road Basketball League
Basketball	Bull City Legacy	Tobacco Road Basketball League
Basketball	Charlotte Tribe	Minor League Basketball; East Coast Basketball League
Basketball	East Carolina Cardinals	Minor League Basketball; East Coast Basketball League
Basketball	Hickory Hoyas	Minor League Basketball; East Coast Basketball League
Basketball	NC Coyotes	Minor League Basketball; East Coast Basketball League
Basketball	Rowan County Bulls	Minor League Basketball; East Coast Basketball League
Basketball	Winston-Salem Wolves	Minor League Basketball; East Coast Basketball League
Football	Carolina Panthers	National Football League
Ice hockey	Carolina Hurricanes	National Hockey League
Ice hockey	Carolina Thunderbirds	Minor league hockey; Federal Prospects Hockey League
Ice hockey	Charlotte Checkers	Minor league hockey; American Hockey League
Ice hockey	Fayetteville Marksmen	Minor league hockey; Southern Professional Hockey League
Ice hockey	Greensboro Gargoyles	Minor league hockey; East Coast Hockey League
Lacrosse	Charlotte Copperheads	North American Lacrosse League
Roller derby	Carolina Rollergirls	WFTDA
Roller derby	Rogue Rollergirls	WFTDA Apprentice Program
Rugby union	Asheville RFC	
Rugby union	Cape Fear RFC	
Rugby union	Charlotte Barbarians	
Rugby union	Charlotte Royals	
Rugby union	Charlotte Valkyrie	
Rugby union	Charlotte Rugby Club	Rugby Super League
Rugby union	Clayton RFC	
Rugby union	Eno River RFC	
Rugby union	Gastonia RFC	
Rugby union	Raleigh RFC	
Rugby union	Triad RFC	
Soccer	Charlotte FC	Major League Soccer
Soccer	Carolina Ascent FC	USL Super League
Soccer	North Carolina Courage	National Women's Soccer League
Soccer	North Carolina FC	On hiatus; last played in the USL Championship
Soccer	Charlotte Independence	USL League One
Soccer	Carolina Core FC	MLS Next Pro
Soccer	Crown Legacy FC	MLS Next Pro
Soccer	Stumptown Athletic	National Independent Soccer Association
Soccer	Charlotte Eagles	USL League Two
Soccer	North Carolina Fusion U23	USL League Two
Soccer	Tobacco Road FC	USL League Two
Soccer	Carolina Lady Dynamo	Women's Premier Soccer League
Soccer	Carolina Rapids	Women's Premier Soccer League
Soccer	Lake Norman Eclipse	Women's Premier Soccer League
Soccer	Oak City United	Women's Premier Soccer League

== Venues ==
See List of sports venues in North Carolina
