= Continental Basketball League =

US men's basketball minor league

Continental Basketball League (CBL)
- Continental Basketball League logo
- Sport: Basketball
- Founded: October 30, 2009
- No. of teams: 6
- Country: USA
- Continent: FIBA Americas (Americas)
- Most recent champion: Cary Invasion
- Most titles: Tie: Cary Invasion, Savannah Wildcats (1)
- Website: Continental Basketball League

The Continental Basketball League (CBL) was a men's basketball minor league in the United States that began play in April 2010. The league was headquartered in Florida.

== History ==
In 2009, Dennis Truax, who was previously affiliated with the Continental Basketball Association (CBA), was named the first commissioner of the CBL. Gary Perry, an owner of the Augusta Groove when it was in the Premier Basketball League (PBL), was named the first director of basketball operations.

On November 2, 2009, the Wilmington Sea Dawgs were the first team to announce joining the league. On February 16, 2010, the Carolina Cougarz became the second team to join the CBL. On February 18, 2010, the Savannah Wildcats became the third team in the CBL. and the Georgia Gwizzlies left the ABA to become the fourth. On March 5, 2010, the Birmingham Steel joined the league.

Two weeks into the 2010 season, the Steel left the league for the World Basketball Association (WBA) and was replaced by the Birmingham Sabers On 1 June 2010, the Georgia Gwizzlies were removed from the league for failure to meet operating standards, after having missed games against Birmingham and Wilmington

The league championship in 2010 was to be decided by a single elimination tournament in June. However, after the removal of the Gwizzlies, the schedule and playoff structure were truncated and adjusted. The playoffs became a one game championship between the first and second place teams, the Sea Dawgs and Wildcats respectively, which was won by the Wildcats 96–86 in overtime.

In July 2010 the Florida Flight moved from the WBA to the CBL. In September 2010, the Miami Stars and Palm Beach Titans joined. On March 28, 2011, the Heartland Prowl announced they had left the ABA to join the CBL. In the announcement of the Prowl, the absence of the Carolina Cougarz as a listed team coupled with their removal from the CBL website indicated that they had folded.

In April 2011, the Gainesville Galaxy joined. On 13 April 2011, the Cary Invasion was added. Sometime between April and early May, the Fayetteville Crossover was added. Before the 2011 season was to start, the owners of the Savannah Wildcats announced the team would be sitting out the season due to a family matter affecting the owners' ability to lead the team. Shortly after this announcement, the CBL announced the addition of the Port City Sharks as a replacement for the Wildcats in Savannah, Georgia. The league also removed the Miami Stars and the Palm Beach Titans from the team list for the 2011 season. The Port City Sharks failed to play the complete schedule and were replaced in later games by travel teams.

In 2011, the league once again played just a championship game, this time between the winner of the North Division, the Cary Invasion and the South runner-up, the Florida Flight, which was won by the Invasion, 131–101. No official explanation was given why the winner of the South Division, the Heartland Prowl, did not play in the game. The Wilmington Sea Dawgs and the Cary Invasion announced the formation of the Tobacco Road Basketball League and their membership therein, thus leaving the CBL. The Fayetteville Crossover then announced their move to this league as well. The Florida Flight moved to the newly formed Florida Basketball Association, and the Miami Stars and Palm Beach Titans went with them.

In 2012, the Raleigh Rough Riders were added to the league. However, the 2012 season was never played. The league planned to return in the spring of 2013, but a lack of teams prevented that.

== Final clubs ==
Team	City	Arena	Founded	First season in CBL
Birmingham Lions Basketball Club	Birmingham, Alabama	TBD	2012	2013
Georgia Razors	Athens, Georgia	Clarke Central High School	2012	2013
Raleigh Rough Riders	Raleigh, North Carolina	BOCC Dream Center	2011	2013
South Florida Stars	TBD, Florida	TBD	2011	2012
Tampa Bay Saints	Tampa, Florida	Mary Help of Christians Center	2011	2011

=== Former teams ===
- Cary Invasion – moved to Tobacco Road Basketball League
- Fayetteville Crossover – moved to Tobacco Road Basketball League
- Wilmington Sea Dawgs – moved to Tobacco Road Basketball League
- Florida Flight – moved to the Florida Basketball Association
- Heartland Prowl – moved to the Florida Basketball Association
- Miami Stars – moved to the Florida Basketball Association
- Palm Beach Titans – moved to the Florida Basketball Association
- Birmingham Sabers – folded after 2011 season
- Port City Sharks – folded midway through 2011 season

== Championship results ==
- 2010: Savannah Wildcats defeated Wilmington Sea Dawgs, 96–86 (OT), June 27, 2010 Joe and Barbara Schwartz Center, Wilmington, North Carolina
- 2011: Cary Invasion defeated Florida Flight, 131–101, June 24, 2011 Herbert Young Community Center, Cary, North Carolina
- 2012: no championship game held
