= Countess de Hoernle Student Life Center =

Multi-purpose arena in West Palm Beach, Florida

Coordinates: 26.715487°N 80.110680°W

The Countess de Hoernle Student Life Center is a multi-purpose arena on the Palm Beach campus of Keiser University in West Palm Beach, Florida. With a capacity of 1,600 people, it is home to the Keiser University Seahawks basketball and volleyball teams, and also to the Palm Beach Titans of the Continental Basketball League.
