= Georgia Gwizzlies =

American semi-professional basketball team

- Founded: 2004
- Folded: 2025
- League: ANBL (2004–2006); ABA (2007-–2009, 2010–2025); CBL (2010)
- Team history: Gwinnett Gwizzlies (2004); Georgia Gwizzlies (2004–2025)
- Based in: Marietta, Georgia
- Arena: TBA
- Colors: Blue, orange, brown
- Owner: Embry Malone
- Head coach: TBA
- Championships: 0

The Georgia Gwizzlies were a basketball team that played in the American Basketball Association. They once played in various men's minor leagues: the Continental Basketball League (CBL), the American National Basketball League, and their original stint in the American Basketball Association. The Georgia Gwizzlies moved from Gwinnett County to Macon in Central Georgia, but upon joining the CBL, moved back to the Greater Atlanta area. Home games will be played in Cobb County, Georgia. Gwizzlies players have been invited to tour France and Spain in early fall each year. Embry Malone begins his six-year as GM and head coach and his two older brothers, Alvin and Bennie Malone are co-owners of the pro basketball organization.

On 1 June 2010, the Gwizzlies were removed from the CBL for failure to meet league standards by not traveling to games against the Birmingham Sabers and Wilmington Sea Dawgs. Soon afterward, they were reinstated into the ABA.

The team folded after the death of owner Embry Malone in 2025
