= MarQus Johnson =

German basketball head coach

Free Agent

Personal information
- Born: Raleigh, North Carolina
- Coaching career: 2011–present

Career history

Coaching
- 2011: Cary Invasion
- 2011–2012: Carolina Jaguars
- 2012–2013: St. Augustine's Falcons (assistant)
- 2015–2022: St. Augustine's Falcons

MarQus Johnson is an American basketball coach who was the former head coach of St. Augustine's Falcons of which was categorized under the bracket NCAA D-II.

== Coaching career ==
On March 3, 2022, it was reported that he would part ways with his team, St. Augustine's Falcons, effective immediately. The school now would probe for their next potential head coach.

== Head coaching record ==
As of March 3, 2022

Team	Year	G	W	L	W–L%	Result
St. Augustine's Falcons	2015-16	27	11	16	.4074	
St. Augustine's Falcons	2016-17	29	13	16	.4483	
St. Augustine's Falcons	2017-18	29	14	15	.4828	
St. Augustine's Falcons	2018-19	28	11	17	.3929	
St. Augustine's Falcons	2019-20	30	12	18	.4000	
St. Augustine's Falcons	2021-22	26	6	20	.2308	
Career		179	67	112	.3743	
