= ECBL =

ECBL may refer to:

- East Coast Basketball League, a men's professional basketball league in the United States.
- Eastern Collegiate Basketball League, the inaugural name of the Atlantic 10 Conference.
