= Yoav Saffar =

Israeli basketball player

Yoav Saffar יואב ספר
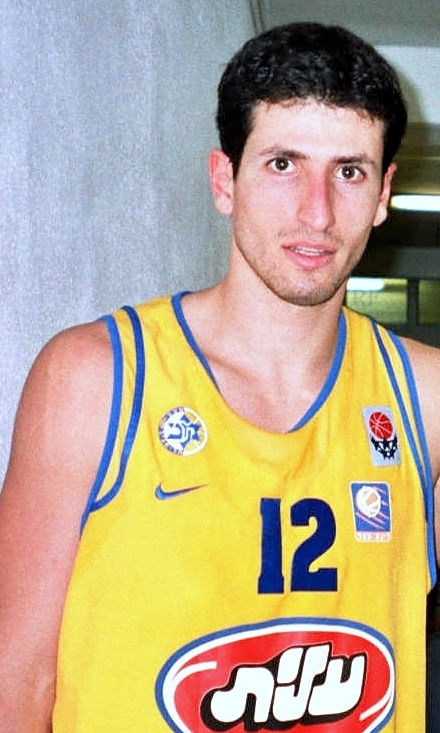

Personal information
- Born: September 30, 1975 (age 50) Tel Aviv, Israel
- Listed height: 6 ft 10 in (2.08 m)
- Position: Power forward

Career highlights
- 2× Israeli Basketball Premier League Quintet (2000, 2001)

Yoav Saffar (Hebrew: יואב ספר; September 30, 1975) is an Israeli former basketball player. He played the power forward position. He was a member of the 2000 and 2001 Israeli Basketball Premier League Quintet.

== Biography ==
Saffar was born in Jaffa, Tel Aviv, Israel. He is 6 ft 10 in (208 cm) tall.

He played for Maccabi Tel Aviv, Hapoel Holon, Maccabi Raanana, and Hapoel Galil Elyon. In 2013, nine years after Saffar retired, he returned and played nine minutes for Holon in a game. He was a member of the 2000 and 2001 Israeli Basketball Premier League Quintet.

Saffar was also a member of the Israel men's national basketball team. He played in the 1996 FIBA European Championship for Men 22 and Under, 1999 FIBA European Championship for Men, 2001 FIBA European Championship for Men, and 2003 FIBA European Championship for Men.

He earned a degree in business at the Wharton School of the University of Pennsylvania in 2010. Saffar then moved to Miami, Florida. He owns SushiGami, a Japanese restaurant in the Sawgrass Mills Mall in Sunrise, Florida.

In 2015, he played for the Miami Midnites, a professional minor league affiliate of Maccabi Haifa, in the Florida Basketball Association.
