= PrimeTime Players =

Minor league professional basketball team from South Carolina, USA

- Founded: 1991
- League: ECBL
- Based in: Fort Mill, South Carolina
- Arena: Fort Mill Community Center
- Colors: Burgundy, Gold
- Owner: Chris Thomas
- Head coach: Chris Thomas
- Championships: 9 (2012, 2013, 2014, 2015, 2016, 2017, 2018, 2019, 2021)
- Cheerleaders: PrimeTime Cheer Team
- Website: primetimeplayersbasketball.com

The PrimeTime Players are a minor league professional basketball team based in Fort Mill, South Carolina. The PrimeTime Players have played independently in the Carolinas since 1991, competing in tournaments and pro-am leagues. The team has competed in The Basketball Tournament which is aired annually on ESPN networks against some of the best professionals in the world.

== History ==
PrimeTime Players are owned by Chris Thomas, who also serves as the team head coach.

After winning the first three Tobacco Road Basketball League championships (2012–14), PrimeTime are a founding member of the East Coast Basketball League. PTP have won ECBL titles in 2015, 2016, 2017, 2018, 2019 and 2021.

=== The Basketball Tournament ===
Making their debut in 2015, PrimeTime traveled to Atlanta as the 19th seed. They won their debut against top-seeded Team DBD, 94–66. The next day, PrimeTime downed HBC, 66–59, to move on to the Super 17. Their run ended on July 24, losing to Dirty South, 76–75.

PrimeTime was the South Region nine seed in 2016, losing in the opening round to Trained To Go, 87–82.

For the 2017 tournament, PrimeTime were seeded tenth in the South Region. The team eliminated Blue Zoo (Middle Tennessee Blue Raiders alumni), 79–77, before falling in the second round to Ram Nation (VCU Rams alumni), 96–82.

In 2018, PrimeTime Players were the 12th seed in the Midwest Region. Their first round opponent, Always A Brave, were a collection of Bradley Braves alumni. PrimeTime advanced to the second round with a 68–64 victory. They defeated the four-seed Big X, 70–67, to earn a spot in the Super 16 in Atlanta where their journey ended, falling to the top-seeded Scarlet & Grey (Ohio State alumni), 72–60.

Seeded fourth in the 2019 Greensboro Regional, PrimeTime Players fell short in their first-round matchup against Florida TNT, 71–68.

Christian Keeling

In TBT 2020, PrimeTime was initially not included in the field of 24, reduced in size due to the COVID-19 pandemic. However, the No. 20 seed, Mid-American Unity, had one of their players test positive, although he was asymptomatic. That team withdrew from the tournament and was replaced by PrimeTime. PrimeTime faced team CP3, the No. 13 seed, in the opening round. PrimeTime led for most of the game, but ultimately were defeated, 76–74.

In TBT 2021, PrimeTime was seeded eighth in the West Virginia Regional. The team faced ninth-seeded Fort Wayne Champs and were defeated, 72–61.

TBT results
Year	Won	Lost
2015	2	1
2016	0	1
2017	1	1
2018	2	1
2019	0	1
2020	0	1
2021	0	1
Total	5	7

== Season-by-season records ==
Year	Regular season		Postseason			The Basketball Tournament
Year	Record	Finish	Record	Result	Scores	Results
2012 (TRBL)	11–1	1st	2-0	TRBL Champions	Semifinals: Won vs Fayetteville Crossover 126–109; Championship: Won vs Cary Invasion 123–103	---
2013 (TRBL)	12-0	1st East	2-0	TRBL Champions	Semifinals: Won vs Big Texas 161-138; Championship: Won vs Cary Invasion 126-118	---
2014 (TRBL)	10-2	1st East	2-0	TRBL Champions	Semifinals: Won vs Palmetto Flight 135-112; Championship: Won vs Cary Invasion 127-108	Did not compete
2015 (ECBL)	12–0	1st South	3-0	ECBL Champions	Division semifinals: Won vs Fort Gordon Eagles 144-115; Division finals: Won vs South Carolina All Stars 133-114; Championship: Won vs Fayetteville Crossover 130-113	1st Round: won vs Team DBD 94-66 2nd Round: won vs HBC 66-59 Super 17: lost vs Dirty South 76-75
2016 (ECBL)	10–2	1st South	3-0	ECBL Champions	Division semifinal: Won vs Carolina Crusaders 131-117; Division final: Won vs South Carolina All Stars 135-108; Championship: Won vs Fayetteville Crossover 119-100	First Round: lost vs Trained To Go 87-82
2017 (ECBL)	13-0	1st South	3-0	ECBL Champions	Division semifinal: Won vs Florence Wildcats 137-110 Conference final: Won vs Carolina Crusaders 131-119 Championship: Won vs Carolina Thunder 125-108	First Round: won vs Blue Zoo 79-77 Second Round: lost vs Ram Nation 96-82
2018 (ECBL)	12-2	1st South	3-0	ECBL Champions	Division semifinal: Won vs Augusta Eagles 142-103 Conference final: Won vs Carolina Thunder 146-107 Championship: Won vs Hickory Hoyas 134-18	First Round: won vs Always A Brave 68-64 Second Round: won vs Big X 70-67 Super 16: lost vs Scarlet & Grey 72-60
2019 (ECBL)	12-1	1st South	3-0	ECBL Champions	Division semifinal: Won vs Augusta Eagles 124-103 Conference final: Won vs Carolina Crusaders 126-93 Championship: Won vs Winston-Salem Wolves 103-99	First Round: lost vs Florida TNT 71-68
2020 (ECBL)	4-0	1st South	---	---	Season cancelled due to COVID-19	First Round: lost vs Team CP3 76-74
2021 (ECBL)	12-2	2nd South	4-0	ECBL Champions	Division semifinal: Won vs Georgia Fire 107-105 Conference final: Won vs Carolina Thunder 160-148 Championship: Won vs North Carolina Coyotes 130-128 Super Cup: Won vs Western Mass Zombies 133-129	First Round: lost vs Fort Wayne Champs
2022 (ECBL)	12-1	1st South	0-1	Semi Finals Loss	Division Semifinal: Loss vs Carolina Crusaders 103-125	
2023 (ECBL)	12-3	2nd South	1-1	Conference Finalist	Division Semifinal: Win vs Gastonia Snipers 136-118 Conference Finals: Loss vs Carolina Thunder 112-128	
2024 (ECBL)	11-5	2nd South	0-1	Semi Finals Loss	Division Semifinal: Loss vs Charlotte Tribe 116-118	
2025 (ECBL)	12-3	2nd South	0-1	Semi Finals Loss	Division Semifinal: Loss vs Queen City Vipers 93-122	
Totals	155-22		26-4	9 championships		
