= Jeffrey Rosen (businessman) =

American businessman

Jeffrey H. Rosen
- Born: Brooklyn, New York
- Citizenship: American
- Education: Northeastern University
- Known for: Former President of Rose Art Industries; Founder, Chairman, and owner of Triangle Financial Services; Owner of Maccabi Haifa; Owner of the Miami Midnites

Jeffrey H. Rosen is an American businessman. He is the founder, chairman, and owner of Triangle Financial Services, a sports and entertainment investment firm, and the owner of both the Maccabi Haifa basketball team in Israel and the Miami Midnites basketball team in the United States.

== Early life ==
Rosen was born in Brooklyn, New York, raised in Queens, New York, and West Orange, New Jersey, and is Jewish. He attended West Essex High School in New Jersey.

He then attended Northeastern University. There, Rosen earned a political science degree.

== Business career ==
Rosen was the President, COO, and owner (with his brother Lawrence and father Sydney) of Rose Art Industries Inc., a toys, stationery, and art and crafts manufacturing and supply company based in Livingston, New Jersey, from 1977 to 2006. His grandfather had founded the company in 1923. He and his brother and father sold the company in 2005 for approximately $350 million, at a time when it had 1,000 employees and 10% of the US arts and crafts market, behind only Crayola.

Thereafter, Rosen founded, and is the chairman and owner of, Triangle Financial Services LLC, of Aventura, Florida, a sports and entertainment investment firm. It invests internationally in sports enterprises, and sponsors a Hong Kong semi-pro baseball team (the Dragonfliers).

Rosen actively tried to promote baseball in Israel.

In July 2007 Rosen purchased the Maccabi Haifa basketball team. He also owns the Miami Midnites basketball team, which he founded and conceived of as a feeder minor league team for Maccabi Haifa, which plays in the Florida Basketball Association and the American Basketball Association.

He now lives in Aventura, Florida.
