= Fayetteville Crossover =

- Founded: 2011
- League: ECBL
- Team history: Fayetteville Crossover (2011–present)
- Based in: Fayetteville, North Carolina
- Arena: John D. Fuller, Sr. Recrerational/Athletic Complex
- Colors: green, black, white
- Owner: Alonzo Lunsford
- Head coach: George Overton, Jr.
- Championships: 0
- Website: FayettevilleCrossover.com

Uniforms
| home | away |

The Fayetteville Crossover are a semi-professional basketball team based in Fayetteville, North Carolina. Home games are played at the John D. Fuller, Sr. Recrerational/Athletic Complex.

== History ==
The team began play in 2011 as a member of the Continental Basketball League. On May 15, 2011, Fayetteville won their first game in team history, defeating the Wilmington Sea Dawgs 107–99.

In November 2011 the team became a part of the new Tobacco Road Basketball League, and played three seasons there, going 14–21 overall.

In July 2014 it was announced that the Crossover would be the fifth member of the new East Coast Basketball League.

== Season-by-season records ==
| Year | W–L | | Postseason |
| Year | Regular season | Playoffs | Result |
|---|---|---|---|
| 2011 (CBL) | 2–6 | DNQ | – |
| 2012 (TRBL) | 5–7 | 0–1 | Semifinals: Lost vs PrimeTime Players 109–126 |
| 2013 (TRBL) | 7–4 | DNQ | – |
| 2014 (TRBL) | 2–9 | DNQ | – |
| 2015 (ECBL) | 10–2 | 2–1 | Championship: Lost vs PrimeTime Players 130–113 |
| 2016 (ECBL) | 7–5 | 2–1 | Championship: Lost vs PrimeTime Players 119–100 |
| Totals | 33–33 | 4–3 | 0 championships |
