= LaRose Industries =

American toy manufacturer

- Founded: 1923; 103 years ago (as Rose Art Industries), 2008; 18 years ago (as LaRose Industries)
- Headquarters: Randolph, New Jersey, U.S.
- Brands: Cra-Z-Art; RoseArt; USA Gold
- Owner: Mattel (2014-2021)
- Parent: Mega Brands (until 2021)
- Website: cra-z-art.com

LaRose Industries, LLC is an American toy, arts & crafts, and stationery company based in Randolph, New Jersey. It sells products primarily under the brands Cra-Z-Art, RoseArt, and USA Gold.

The modern company was founded in 2008 by Lawrence Rosen, whose grandfather Isidor had founded the original RoseArt company in 1923. After the sale of the company by Rosen, his father, and his brother Jeffrey Rosen to Mega Brands in 2005, Lawrence Rosen began a new company, primarily using the Cra-Z-Art branding for its products. Mega Brands was acquired by Mattel in 2014.

Early in 2021, LaRose Industries announced it purchased the RoseArt brand from Mattel.

== History ==
The original company was established when Isidor Rosen founded the Rosebud Art Company in New York City in 1923. During the 1970s, the company renamed itself RoseArt. In 2005, Isidor's son, Sydney, and his two sons sold RoseArt to Mega Brands.

In September 2006, the Rosens, as former owners of Rose Art Industries, filed suit against Mega Brands, alleging insider trading by company executives in 2005 and 2006. Mega Brands counter sued and in November 2009 the parties settled. The Rosens agreed to pay back $17.2 million and forgo claims of an additional $54.8 million.

Early in 2021, LaRose Industries, announced it purchased the RoseArt brand from Mattel. The purchase reunites the RoseArt brand with the Rosen family.

== See also ==
- Crayola
