= Augusta Groove =

- Leagues: ABA 2005–2006 CBA 2007–2008 PBL 2008–2009
- Founded: 2005
- Folded: 2009
- History: Charlotte Krunk; 2005–06; Atlanta Krunk; 2006; Atlanta Krunk Wolverines; 2006–07; Atlanta Krunk; 2007–08; Augusta Groove; 2008–09
- Arena: Cricket Arena; 2005–06; John H. Lewis Gymnasium; 2006–08; Richmond Academy gymnasium 2008–09
- Location: Augusta, Georgia
- Team colors: Purple & Orange
- Head coach: Rick Brown
- Ownership: Gary Perry; LaVon Mercer; Ricky Brown

The Augusta Groove was a basketball team that played in the modern American Basketball Association (ABA), the Continental Basketball Association (CBA), and the Premier Basketball League (PBL). Formerly, the team was known as the Charlotte Krunk in the ABA, where they played at Charlotte, North Carolina's Cricket Arena, and the Atlanta Krunk of the CBA.

== History ==
=== Charlotte, North Carolina (2006–07) ===
The franchise began operations in 2005 as the Charlotte Krunk. It never actually played a game in Charlotte, however. Just before the 2005-06 season, nearly all of the teams in their division shut down, forcing the team to suspend operations between December 2005 and January 2006. Team owner Duane "Spyder-D" Hughes announced the suspension of operations in an emotional letter on the team's website, thanking the city of Charlotte and the businesses that helped his team. In the letter he announced plans for a celebrity basketball game, and youth concert to be held at Cricket Arena.

=== Atlanta, Georgia (2007–08) ===
On August 7, 2006, the team announced they would be moving to the Continental Basketball Association as the Atlanta Krunk. On the 21st, they announced that they would by playing at the John H. Lewis Gymnasium at Morris Brown College. Finally, on the 24th, they announced they would be called the Atlanta Krunk Wolverines in honor of Morris Brown's athletics program, now discontinued.

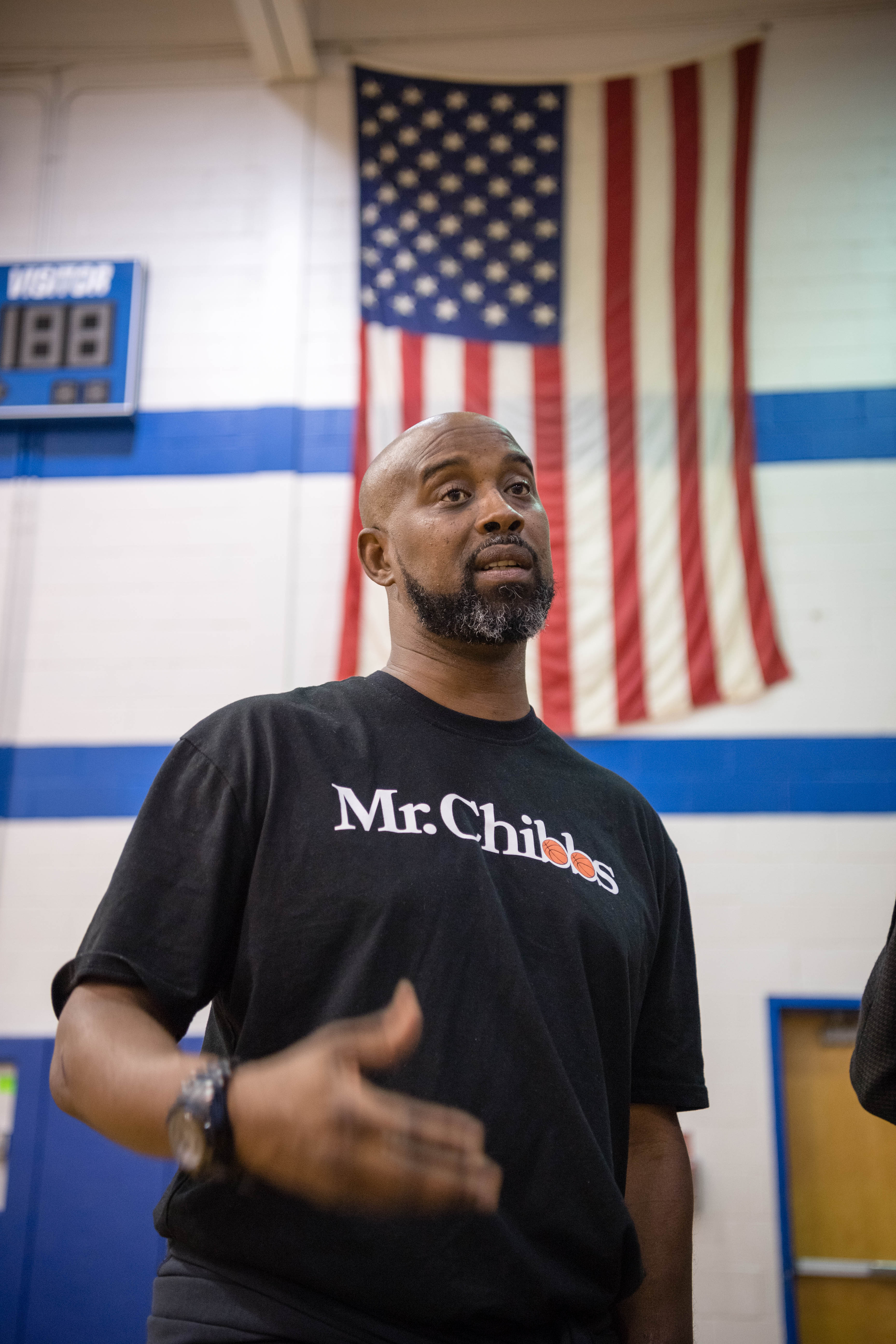
Former NBA player Kenny Anderson served as the team's head coach during the 2007–08 season.

Prior to the 2007–2008 season, the team changed their name back to Atlanta Krunk. The Krunk also added a majority owner, Freedom Williams.

Next, the owners announced their new head coach, former Georgia Tech and NBA standout Kenny Anderson. As a general manager, the owners and coach selected Vincent Smith, a basketball trainer who is also the brother of TNT basketball analyst Kenny Smith.

The team then revealed that they had signed Grayson Boucher, known as "The Professor" during his days on the And 1 streetball tour. Further, the team added the brother of Stephon Marbury, known as "Zeck" Marbury according to the team's website and the CBA, or "Zech" or "Zach" Marbury from his NBA days.

In another announcement prior to the 2006–2007 season, Starbury, Stephon Marbury's clothing company, was revealed as the designer of the Krunk uniforms.

Some footage has also been shot for a reality show about the Atlanta Krunk, featuring owners Freedom Williams, Duane "Spyder D" Hughes, and other team personnel and players. Plans for the release of the show have not yet been announced.

The Atlanta Krunk made it through the season with the assistance of new owners. After the John L. Lewis Gymnasium was deemed unsuitable for CBA games, the team finished its schedule on the road. The Krunk ended the year 9–41, including nine forfeit losses. The season was noted for several missed paychecks, and an ever-shifting roster after the first month due to financial woes. The Krunk appeared on the road without uniforms, and completed one road trip with just five players.

=== Augusta, Georgia (2008–09) ===
The team was purchased by Gary Perry, LaVon Mercer, and Ricky Brown in the middle of the '07–'08 season, and looked to relocate elsewhere in Georgia. Leading candidates were Columbus (where they would play at the Columbus Civic Center) and Augusta (where the venue would be the James Brown Arena). Augusta was chosen and the team was renamed the Augusta Groove. However, the James Brown Arena was ruled out as a home.

On June 5, 2008, the team announced its move to the Premier Basketball League. and on July 10, the Groove announced they would be playing at the Christenberry Fieldhouse on the Augusta State University campus. This did not hold, as on November 12, they announced they would play in the gym at Richmond Academy. The team finished the year with a .500 record amid controversy about player pay and remuneration for hotel stays.

In an interview on 3 November 2009 that Perry conducted with the Augusta Chronicle, he announced both his affiliation with the Continental Basketball League and the official end of the Groove.

== Season-by-season records ==
Note: W = wins, L = losses, % = win–loss %

Season	W	L	%	Playoffs	Results
Charlotte Krunk
2005–06	0	0	.000		
Atlanta Krunk
2007–08	9	41	.180		
Augusta Groove
2008–09	10	10	.500		
Totals	19	51	.271		

== See also ==
- Crunk (music genre)
