= Atlanta Thoroughbreds =

American indoor football team

Logo

General information
- Founded: 2006
- Folded: 2007
- Headquartered: Atlanta, Georgia at the John H. Lewis Gymnasium
- Colors: Brown, gold, black, white

Personnel
- Head coach: John Mannino

Team history
- Atlanta Thoroughbreds (2007)

Home fields
- John H. Lewis Gymnasium (2007)

League / conference affiliations
- National Indoor Football League (2007)

The Atlanta Thoroughbreds were an indoor football team. They were a 2007 expansion member of the National Indoor Football League (NIFL). They were scheduled to play their home games at the John H. Lewis Gymnasium in Atlanta, Georgia, but failed to play any home games. Of the 2007 league-owned expansion teams, the Thoroughbreds were the only team that was competitive, losing both games (before the league collapsed) by 14 points or less. After the league collapsed, the team became a primarily fill-in team and many players left. The head coach was John Mannino. The offense was led by QB, J.R. Revere and defense by S, Brad Shea.

== Season-By-Season ==
Season records
Season	W	L	T	Finish	Playoff results
2007	0	4	0	5th Atlantic	--
