= Amir Celestin =

American professional basketball player

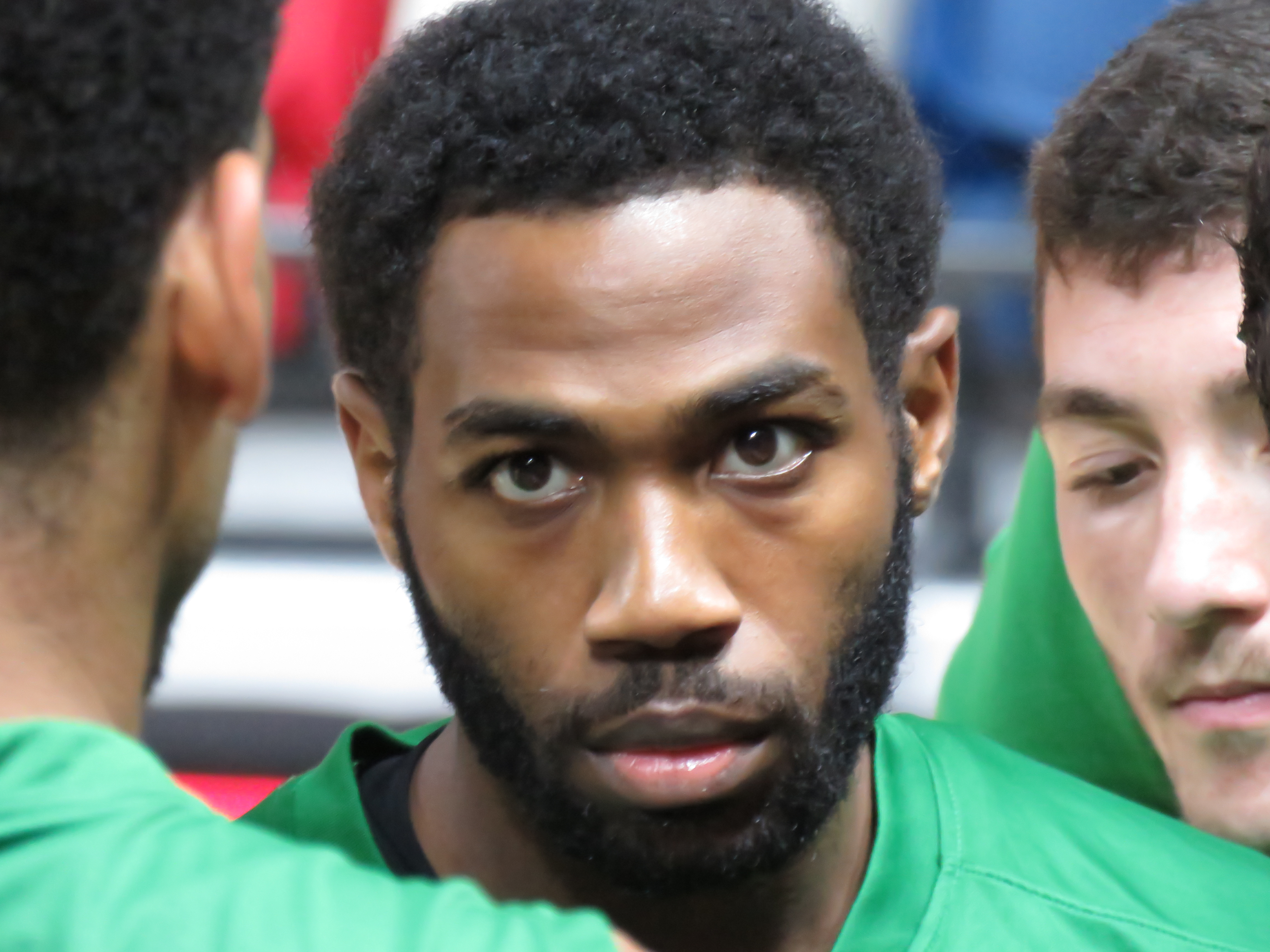

No. 4 – Maccabi Haifa
- Position: Guard
- League: Ligat HaAl

Personal information
- Born: July 18, 1990 (age 36) Miami, Florida
- Listed height: 6 ft 1 in (1.85 m)
- Listed weight: 185 lb (84 kg)

Career information
- High school: Miami Norland (Miami, Florida)
- College: Campbell (2008–2012)
- NBA draft: 2012: undrafted

Career history
- 2014–2015: Miami Midnites
- 2015–present: Maccabi Haifa

Amir Celestin (born July 18, 1990) is an American professional basketball player who currently plays for Maccabi Haifa of the Israeli Basketball Premier League. He played college basketball for Campbell University in NCAA Division Iwhere he starred in his four seasons with the Campbell Fighting Camels.

== Professional career ==
After leaving Campbell University in 2012 Amir became an unrestricted free agent.

=== Maccabi Haifa ===
Amir Celestin competed for his hometown minor league team the Miami Midnites, based in Miami, Florida. Established in 2014, the club is an affiliate of Maccabi Haifa B.C. of the Israeli Basketball Premier League, The team is owned by Jeffrey Rosen, CEO of Triangle Entertainment.

On August 25, 2015, Amir signed a 3-year deal with Maccabi Haifa of the Israeli Basketball Premier League.
