= John H. Lewis Gymnasium =

Sports venue in Atlanta, Georgia

Coordinates: 33°45′12″N 84°24′21″W

The John H. Lewis Gymnasium is a 7,000 seat venue near the campus of Morris Brown College.

It was home to the Atlanta Thoroughbreds National Indoor Football League team and the Atlanta Krunk Wolverines Continental Basketball Association team.
