= Wilmington Sea Dawgs =

Minor league professional basketball team in Wilmington, North Carolina, United States

- League: ABA (2006–2007); PBL (2007–2009); CBL (2009–2011); TRBL (2011–present)
- Founded: 2006
- History: Wilmington Sea Dawgs (2006–present)
- Arena: Wilmington Basketball Center
- Location: Wilmington, North Carolina
- Team colors: light blue, tan, white, black
- Head coach: Louis Defeliceantonio
- Ownership: Peter Gratale

The Wilmington Sea Dawgs are a professional basketball team and founding member of the Tobacco Road Basketball League. The team is based in Wilmington, North Carolina, and began play in 2006 as a member of the American Basketball Association. The team later played as a founding member of the Premier Basketball League and a founding member of the Continental Basketball League. In 2013, the team played at Blizzard Athletics, having previously played at the Joe and Barbara Schwartz Center on the campus of Cape Fear Community College.

== History ==
The Sea Dawgs won the ABA Blue Central division in their first year with a record of 19-8 and advanced to the playoff semi-finals, losing to the eventual champion Vermont Frost Heaves. In their playoff run, they were scheduled to meet the defending champion Rochester Razorsharks, but weather-related travel problems caused the game to not be played. The ABA CEO then refused to reschedule the game although the two teams had agreed to a make up date. The CEO instead tried to force Rochester to accept a forfeit. This incident motivated the Razorsharks to leave the ABA and help form the Premier Basketball League (PBL).

The team moved to the PBL for the 2007–08 season. They played in the East Division. They finished the regular season at 11-9 and tied for second in the division with the Reading Railers behind the Rochester Razorsharks. They made the playoffs and faced the Maryland Nighthawks in the first round but lost. On April 22, 2008, Kevin Whitted resigned as head coach of the Sea Dawgs On October 17, Dale Kuhl was named head coach.

The team took a much more defensive approach compared to previous years and after a slow start sprinted to second place in their division and a wild card berth in the PBL playoffs with a record of 15-5. The Sea Dawgs were the first team this season to defeat the Battle Creek Knights (who finished 18-2 and were 12-0 at the time of their second meeting). The Sea Dawgs swept four games against the Detroit Panthers and five games against the Augusta Groove. The Sea Dawgs ended their season losing in the playoff semi-finals to the Knights.

On 2 November 2009, the Sea Dawgs announced via e-mail their move to the spring season Continental Basketball League. The team finished with an 11-5 record and was the number one seed for (and thereby host for) the CBL Championship, which they lost in overtime to the Savannah Wildcats.

One of the team's previous co-owners left the team to found the Cary Invasion. The Sea Dawgs's four year playoff streak was snapped in a rather mediocre campaign where the club finished 5-6 and missed the playoffs.

The team announced (with the Cary Invasion) the formation of the Tobacco Road Basketball League and their membership therein.

The TRBL added divisional play, moving the Sea Dawgs to the East Division. The Sea Dawgs also changed their home venue to Blizzard Athletics. Dale Kuhl was replaced as coach by Louis Defeliceantonio. Long time player Joseph King also assumed assistant coaching duties.

== Season-By-Season records ==
Year	Regular Season		Postseason		
Year	Record	Win %	Record	Win %	Result
American Basketball Association (2006–07)
2006-07	19-8	.704	2–1	.667	Round 1 – Won vs. Rochester Razorsharks, forfeit Round 2 – Won vs. Mississippi Miracles, 130-112; Round 3 – Lost vs. Vermont Frost Heaves, 85-113
Premier Basketball League (2007–09)
2007-08	11-9	.550	0–1	.000	Round 1 – Lost vs. Maryland Nighthawks, 112-125
2008-09	15–5	.750	2–2	.500	Round 1 – Won vs. Vermont Frost Heaves, 96-90; Round 2 – Lost vs. Battle Creek Knights, 1-2 (Best of 3 series)
Continental Basketball League (2010–11)
2010	11–5	.688	0-1	.000	Championship – Lost vs. Savannah Wildcats, 86-96 (OT)
2011	5–6	.454	0-0	.000	Missed the playoffs
Tobacco Road Basketball League (2012–present)
2012	6–6	.500	0-1	.000	Round 1 – Lost vs. Cary Invasion, 104-127
2013	2–8	.222	0-0	.000	-
Totals	69–47	.595	4–6	.400	0 championships
