= C-Port Trojans =

American basketball team

- Founded: May 2010; 16 years ago
- League: ECBL
- Team history: Savannah Storm (2010–2017); C-Port Trojans (2018–present)
- Based in: Savannah, Georgia
- Arena: Savannah High School
- Owner: Juanita Simmons and Demetrius Holloway
- Head coach: Tony Hallett
- Championships: 0

The C-Port Trojans are a member of the East Coast Basketball League (ECBL). The Trojans previously competed in the American Basketball Association during 2010–11 season.

The Trojans are located in Savannah, Georgia, with home games played on the campus of Savannah High School.

== History ==
An expansion team in the ABA, Savannah finished their first regular season 11–6, third place in the Southeast Division. Savannah was selected to host the six-team regional. On March 12, 2011, the Storm won their first-ever playoff game, 102–94 over the Columbus Riverballers. The team followed that historic victory with a 162–152 win over the Heartland Prowl in the second round of the ABA Playoffs. Their run ended in the third round, losing to the South Central Division champion East Kentucky Energy.

On October 21, 2014, the ECBL announced the Storm as the 11th league member.

In November 2017 the Storm announced the addition of co-owner Demetrius Holloway. The team rebranded as C-Port Trojans.

== Season by season ==
Season	Wins	Losses	Finish	Playoffs
2010-11 ABA	11	6	3rd Southeast Division	3rd Round
2015 ECBL	4	7	5th of 5 Southern	DNQ
2016 ECBL	5	7	5th of 6 Southern	DNQ
2017 ECBL	4	8	3rd of 4 Southeast	DNQ
2018 ECBL	2	9	4th of 4 Southeast	DNQ
