= Ultimate in North Carolina =

Ultimate (sport) is a growing sport in North Carolina. The state has national level competing teams at youth, college, club, and professional levels. Regionally youth clubs compete in the South, college teams compete in the ACC, and club teams compete in the southeast. These teams consist of over 1,000 USAU members

== Youth ==
TYUL (Triangle Youth Ultimate League) Triforce based in the Research Triangle area. The under 19's boys team finished runners-up at the 2015 National Youth Club Championship. TYUL consists of two under-19 and two under-16 boys teams, as well as one of each for girls.

== College ==
Both men and women's teams from universities around North Carolina compete in either the NCAA Division I (since 1984 for men and 1987 for women) or NCAA Division III level (since 2010 for both men and women). Universities in North Carolina have accumulated a total of eight Men's College Championships and four Women's College Championships as of 2021.

USA Ultimate Men's College Series Champions from North Carolina
College	Times Won	Years won
UNC-CH	4	2015, 2018, 2021, 2022
ECU	2	1994, 1995
NC State	1	1999
UNC Wilmington	1	1993

USA Ultimate Women's College Series Champions from North Carolina
College	Times Won	Years won
UNC Wilmington	2	1992, 1996
UNC Chapel Hill	2	2021, 2022

== Club ==
Men: There are many club ultimate teams that compete at sectionals in North Carolina. Ring of Fire, based in the Raleigh-Durham area competes nationally and internationally and won the 2021 USA Ultimate Championship.

Women: The main women's club ultimate team is Phoenix. They compete nationally and internationally, and finished third at the 2021 USA Ultimate Championship.

Mixed: Toro, based in Durham, NC, and Cahoots, based in Asheville, NC are the two competing mixed club teams in North Carolina. Toro was ranked 27th in the nation at the end of the 2016 season.

== Professional ==
North Carolina is home to a professional ultimate team, the Carolina Flyers of the AUDL. The Flyers won the 2021 AUDL Championship. A second AUDL, the Charlotte Express, folded in 2016.
