= Savannah Wildcats =

Basketball team based in Savannah, Georgia, U.S.

- Founded: 2010; 16 years ago
- League: Continental Basketball League
- Team history: Savannah Wildcats (2010-present)
- Based in: Savannah, Georgia
- Arena: Armstrong Atlantic State University
- Colors: Black, Gold, White
- Owner: Lamont Moreno
- Head coach: TBD
- Championships: 1 (2010)
- Website: SavannahWildcats.com

Uniforms
home	away

The Savannah Wildcats are a charter member of the Continental Basketball League based in Savannah, Georgia which began play in 2010. They played their games at Alfred E. Beach High School during their inaugural season, but switched to Armstrong Atlantic State University for year two. They won the league championship in their first year.
