= Greensboro Cobras =

- Founded: 2013; 13 years ago
- League: TRBL (2013–present)
- Based in: Greensboro, North Carolina
- Arena: Ida H. Goode gymnasium, Bennett College
- Colors: Green, Yellow
- Owner: Terry E. Cooper
- Head coach: Terry E. Cooper
- Championships: 0
- Website: cobras.trblproball.com

The Greensboro Cobras is a member of the Tobacco Road Basketball League based in Greensboro, North Carolina that began play in 2013. Home games are played at the Ida H. Goode gymnasium on the campus of Bennett College.
