= Palm Beach Knights =

Professional minor-league basketball team in West Palm Beach, Florida

- Founded: 2011
- League: FBA (2012-present)
- Team history: Palm Beach Titans (2011-2013); Palm Beach Knights (2013-present)
- Based in: Riviera Beach, Florida
- Arena: Inlet Grove High School
- Colors
- Owner: Shamel A. Taylor
- Championships: 1 (2018)

The Palm Beach Knights are a professional minor league basketball team based in West Palm Beach, Florida. The Knights compete in the Florida Basketball Association.

== History ==
Formed in 2011 as the Palm Beach Titans, the team joined the new FBA for its inaugural season in 2012. The team rebranded as the Knights for the 2013 season.

The Knights captured their first league championship in 2018, defeating the Space Coast Stars in the finals in two consecutive games.

== Season-by-season ==
Season	W	L	Finish	Playoff result
2012				
2013	0	12	4th of 4	Lost semifinal vs Tampa Bay Rebels
2014	3	9	4th of 5	Lost semifinal vs Miami Midnites
2015	5	7	3rd of 4	Lost championship vs Miami Midnites
2016	1	7	5th of 5	Lost semifinal vs Miami Midnites
2017	8	2	2nd of 6	Lost semifinal vs Space Coast Stars
2018	8	3	2nd of 6	Won championship vs Space Coast Stars
2019			TBD	TBD
