= Winston-Salem Wolves =

Professional minor league basketball franchise in North Carolina

The Winston-Salem Wolves are a professional minor league basketball franchise based in Winston-Salem, North Carolina. The team was founded in December, 2018.

The team is playing in the East Coast Basketball League (ECBL) for the 2019 regular season, in addition to participating against teams from other minor leagues and college programs.
The 2019 Wolves regular home games are played in the Childress Activities Center on the campus of Forsyth Country Day School in Lewisville, NC.

== Current roster ==
Winston-Salem Wolves roster
Players
Coaches

Pos.	No.	Nat.	Name	Ht.	Wt.	Age
PG	5	(United States)	Robinson, Antonio	6 ft 4 in (1.93 m)
SG	1	(United States)	Lynch, LePreece	6 ft 5 in (1.96 m)
F	9	(United States)	Banks, Zalinor	6 ft 6 in (1.98 m)
F	6	(United States)	Adams, Dionté	6 ft 8 in (2.03 m)
G	10	(United States)	Singleton, Joshea	6 ft 4 in (1.93 m)
G	4	(United States)	Fulcher, Khadier	6 ft 3 in (1.91 m)
F	8	(United States)	Gregory, Ian	6 ft 6 in (1.98 m)
F	13	(United States)	Woods, Chris	6 ft 5 in (1.96 m)
PG	2	(United States)	Fullwood, T.J.	6 ft 1 in (1.85 m)
SF	7	(United States)	Hill, Seth	6 ft 6 in (1.98 m)
SF	10	(United States)	Lidral-Porter, Brendan	6 ft 5 in (1.96 m)
SF	0	(United States)	Ayabarreno, Davion	6 ft 6 in (1.98 m)
PG		(United States)	Smith, Trey	5 ft 10 in (1.78 m)
PG		(United States)	Cannady, Jalen	6 ft 7 in (2.01 m)

Head coach

- (United States) David Solomon

Assistant coach(es)

- (United States) Kevin Beard
- (United States) Aaron Hogner

Legend

- (C) Team captain
- Injured

- Roster

== History ==
After establishing the team in December, 2018, the team then announced the hiring of David Solomon as head coach during that same month.

The first player signed to the roster was Antonio Robinson, a 6'4" point guard who played collegiate basketball for East Carolina University, and had international experience as a professional in China and the UK.

The team's first game in franchise history was a scrimmage versus the Gastonia Snipers, a professional travel team, which the Wolves won 107–97.

The Wolves then opened up their first ECBL regular season on the road against division rival Rowan County Bulls with a win, 131–120.

Historical Performance

Season	Record	Final
2019	14-1	ECBL Northern Conference Regular Season Champions, ECBL Northern Conference Champions, ECBL Runner Up
2020	0-2	Season cancelled due to COVID-19 outbreak
2021	0-12	
2022	5-7	
2023	10-3	ECBL Northern Conference Regular Season Champions
2023	11-3	

Head Coaches

Name	Years	Record
David Solomon	2019-2021	14-15
Antonio Robinson	2022-Present	26-13

== Team information ==
League: East Coast Basketball League
Conference: Northern
Division: Northeast

Official Team Site: WSWolves.com

== Staff ==
Head Coach: David Solomon
Assistant Coach: Kevin Beard
Assistant Coach: Aaron Hogner

Co-Owner/General Manager: Marcus Shockley

Co-Owner/Director of Operations: Kishon Bishop

== News/Links ==
Winston-Salem Wolves Win Exhibition Opener over Gastonia Snipers

New Minor League Basketball Team to Debut in Winston Salem in 2019 (Dec 11, 2018)

Winston-Salem Wolves Join ECBL (Dec 10, 2018)
