= Carolina Cougarz =

- Founded: 2016
- League: American Basketball Association (February 2016-June 2016)
- Team history: Carolina Cougarz (February 2016-June 2016)
- Based in: Columbia, South Carolina
- Arena: Brookland Baptist Church
- Colors: White, Orange, Black
- Head coach: None

Uniforms
home	away

The Carolina Cougarz was a Charter member of the American Basketball Association. The team was based in Columbia, South Carolina and was established in February 2016 and disbanded in June 2016. Upon new ownership the name was changed back to The Carolina Cougars to connect with its origins.

The team was co-owned by Allen Franklin and Todd Miller.
