= Bull City Legacy =

- Founded: 2014
- League: TRBL (2014-present)
- Based in: Durham, North Carolina
- Arena: Walltown Recreation Center
- Colors: Black, Orange
- Championships: 0
- Website: legacy.trblproball.com

Uniforms
home	away

The Bull City Legacy is a member of the Tobacco Road Basketball League based in Durham, North Carolina which began play in 2014. Home games are played at the Walltown Recreation Center

== 2013 - 2014 ==
The team finished their inaugural season in the TRBL in second place in the East division with a final record of 7-5.
