= Florida Basketball Association =

Basketball league in Florida, United States

- Sport: Basketball
- Founded: 2012
- First season: 2012
- No. of teams: 9
- Country: United States
- Continent: FIBA Americas (Americas)
- Most recent champion: Florida Flight (2025)
- Most titles: Miami Midnites (3)
- Website: www.theFBA.com

The Florida Basketball Association (FBA) is a semi-professional men's basketball league that began play in the fall of 2012 with teams in Orlando, Lake Wales, and Palm Beach Gardens.

The commissioner of the FBA is former NBA player Greg Kite.

== History ==
The inaugural season of 2012 was played with four teams. Tampa Bay Rebels defeated Heartland Prowl to win the first FBA championship.

The Rebels (10-2) and Prowl (9-3) dominated league play in 2013 and met in the championship game once again. Heartland Prowl avenged their first season loss by defeating Tampa Bay 111-109. Prowl forward Arnold Lewis was named FBA Finals MVP, scoring 27 points.

In October 2013 the owners of the FBA voted to accept the expansion application of the Miami Midnites, owned by Jeffrey Rosen. Rosen also owns Maccabi Haifa B.C. of the Israeli Basketball Premier League.

Miami (11-1) stormed through the 2014 season, losing just once (104-103) to Tampa Bay on May 25, 2014. The teams met in the championship game in August with the Midnites capturing the FBA title in their inaugural season.

In October 2014 the expansion Marion County Showtime Stallions were added as a FBA member. Marion County played out of Ocala in the 2015 season, but ceased operations before the end of their season.

Miami Midnites repeated as FBA champion in 2015, finishing with a perfect 14-0 record. Guard Amir Celestin was named MVP after scoring a game-high 39 points, 7 assists, 5 rebounds and 3 steals. After the season Celestin signed a three-year contract with Maccabi Haifa B.C.

Space Coast Stars were announced as the newest FBA expansion club in October 2015. The Stars are owned by former FBA player (Florida Flight) Corey Williams, who also serves as head boys basketball coach at Bethany Christian School in Melbourne (home of the Stars). Just before the new season Tampa Bay Saints were added after the Heartland Prowl ceased operations.

== Teams ==
Team	City	Arena	Founded	First season in FBA
Clermont Crocs	Clermont, Florida	Clermont Recreational Center	2020	2020
Florida Flight	Orlando, Florida	RDV Sportsplex	2010	2012
Fort Lauderdale Herd BC	Fort Lauderdale, Florida	Betty T. Ferguson Recreational Complex	2018	2019
Gainesville Mighty Oaks	Gainesville, Florida	TBD	2020	2020
Palm Beach Knights	Palm Beach Gardens, Florida	Mandel Jewish Community Center	2012	2012
St. Pete Tide	St. Petersburg, Florida	St. Petersburg Catholic High School	2016	2017
Winter Park Storm	Winter Park, Florida	Winter Park Community Center	2019	2019

=== Former teams ===
- Poinciana Pride (2018-2022)
- Brevard Bobcats (2022)
- Tampa Gunners (2019-)
- Bradenton GymRats (2015-2017)
- Heartland Prowl (2012-15)
- Jacksonville Royals (2017-2018)
- Marion County Showtime Stallions (2015)
- Miami Midnites (2014-2016)
- Palm Beach Titans (2013)
- Space Coast Stars (2016-2019)
- Tampa Bay Rebels (2012-14)

== Champions ==
Season	Champion	Runner-up	Result
2012	Tampa Bay Rebels	Heartland Prowl	131-106
2013	Heartland Prowl	Tampa Bay Rebels	111-109
2014	Miami Midnites	Tampa Bay Rebels	98-82
2015	Miami Midnites	Palm Beach Knights	151-131
2016	Miami Midnites	Space Coast Stars	126-108
2017	St. Pete Tide	Space Coast Stars	141-129; 110-102
2018	Palm Beach Knights	Space Coast Stars	121-118; 120-100
2019	Florida Flight	Palm Beach Knights	123-117;
2021	Clermont Crocs	Florida Flight	116-102;
2022	Lakeland Royals	Central Florida Blazers	
2023	Kissimmee Lambs	Volusia County Serpents	86-80
2024	Florida Flight	Clermont Crocs	95-82
2025	Florida Flight	Clermont Crocs	114-88
2026	Clermont Crocs	Volusia Serpents	
