= Birmingham Sabers =

- Founded: 2010
- League: CBL (2010-2011)
- Team history: Birmingham Sabers (2010-2011)
- Based in: Birmingham, Alabama
- Arena: Altamont School
- Colors: Gold, Black, White
- Owner: Paul Smith
- Head coach: Paul Smith
- Dancers: Saber Girls
- Website: www.BirminghamSabers.com

Uniforms
home	away

The Birmingham Sabers were a team of the Continental Basketball League based in Birmingham, Alabama that began play in 2010

The team was born when the Birmingham Steel moved to the WBA. The CBL commissioner, Dennis Truax, announced that Paul Smith would take over as owner of the Birmingham franchise. Several Steel players stayed with the Sabers, who also retained the team records and statistics of the Steel.

== Season-by-season record ==
Season	W	L	Win %	Result
2010	5	5	.500	4th
