= Herbert Young Community Center =

Recreation center in Cary, North Carolina

Coordinates: 35°47′26.1″N 78°46′49.7″W

Herbert C. Young Community Center
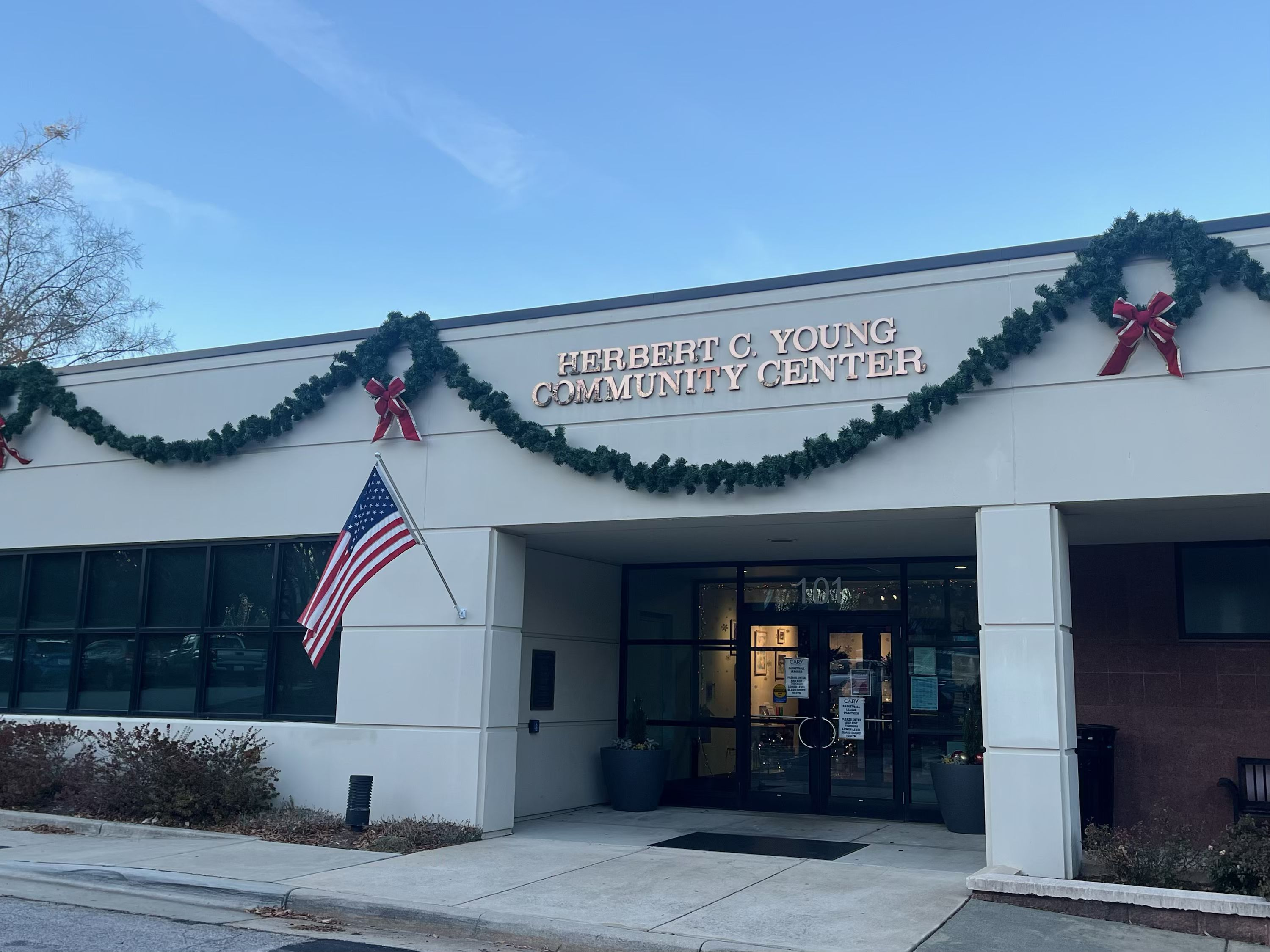
- Interactive map of the Herbert C. Young Community Center area

General information
- Location: Cary, North Carolina, 101 Wilkinson Ave.
- Opened: 1991
- Owner: Town of Cary

The Herbert C. Young Community Center is the local community and recreation center in Cary, North Carolina.

The center opened in 1991, and was the first such facility in the town. It was renamed in 2001 in honor of Herb Young, a 20-year volunteer and former Town Council member who also served on the Parks, Recreation & Cultural Resources Advisory Board member. The facility supports athletic programs and fitness classes among other events. The lower gymnasium can support large events, such as performing arts or other large special events.

== Service and Amenities ==
- Coach Kay Yow Court Basketball Court
- Meeting rooms
- Kitchen for catering and classes
- Locker rooms
- Vending area

== Sports ==
The Herbert C. Young Community Center is home to the Cary Invasion, a professional basketball team which play in the Tobacco Road Basketball League.
