= Tobacco Road Basketball League =

Basketball League in Carolina

Tobacco Road Basketball League (TRBL)
- Sport: Basketball
- Founded: November 18, 2011
- Folded: 2016
- Country: United States
- Continent: FIBA Americas (Americas)
- Last champion: Raleigh Revolt (2016)
- Most titles: PrimeTime Players (3)
- Website: TRBLProBall.com

The Tobacco Road Basketball League (TRBL) was a professional men's basketball minor league in the United States that began play in April 2012. The league is centered in the Carolinas.

In November 2014 the TRBL entered into an affiliation agreement with the Premier Basketball League (PBL).

== History ==
In 2011, the Wilmington Sea Dawgs and the Cary Invasion announced the formation of the Tobacco Road Basketball League and their membership therein, thus leaving the Continental Basketball League. The Fayetteville Crossover then announced their move to this league as well. On 2 December 2011, the Carolina Gladiators and PrimeTime Players joined the league. In January 2012, the league announced the addition of three travel/exhibition teams: Team Macleem, Queen City Express, and Big Texas.

After the league's first season, the Carolina Gladiators moved to Robeson County, North Carolina and a new team called the Johnston County Nighthawks took their place in Smithfield.

In October 2012, the league provisionally added the Blue Ridge Bison of Hendersonville, the Spartanburg Silver Lakers of South Carolina, the Greensboro Cobras, and a travel team, Team HoopForLyfe. They also said that the Express and Big Texas had found home venues and would play a full schedule.

In December 2012, the league announced venues for Greensboro and the Hub City Lakers (renamed from the Spartanburg Silver Lakers), added the Bull City Legacy as a provisional team, and noted that Johnston County would be a travel team. It also said that the league would move to divisional play for the 2013 season.

In October 2013, the league announced four additions, promoting the Bull City Legacy and South Carolina All-Stars to full members, after both having played 2013 as travel teams. The league added the Neuse River Basketball Club as a replacement for the Johnston County Nighthawks and added the Palmetto Flight.

Changes were put in place for the 2014–15 season, primarily with the new flex-schedule. Games are played between November 1 and April 30 against "TRBL-sanctioned" teams. League teams are free to schedule as many games as they choose. All teams who play at least 10 sanctioned games are eligible for the playoffs.

As a result of the change, five members (Carolina Gladiators, Fayetteville Crossover, PrimeTime Players, Queen City Express, and South Carolina All-Stars) left the league. Those teams would go on to form the East Coast Basketball League.

In August 2015 the Premier Basketball League and TRBL announced an expanded partnership which included six TRBL teams to compete as the PBL South East Division. Teams included are Cary Invasion, Charlotte Elite, Durham Legacy, Huntersville HoopForLyfe and Wilmington Sea Dawgs.

After the 2016 season Lumberton Showstoppers announced that they were joining the ECBL. Seven more teams (Auburn Pro Elite Flyers, Chapel Hill Blue Force, Charlotte Elite, Greensboro Cobras, HoopForLyfe, Raleigh Revolt, Savannah Cavaliers and Wilmington Sea Dawgs) left the league before the beginning of the season, which caused a delay to the start.

== Teams ==
Team	City	Arena	Founded	First season in TRBL
All American Ballers	Fayetteville, North Carolina	The Well United Methodist Church	2014	2014
Cary Invasion	Cary, North Carolina	Herbert Young Community Center	2011	2012
High Point Heat	High Point, North Carolina	Ragsdale YMCA	2013	2013

=== Former teams ===
- Atlanta Dynamite All Stars
- Atlantic Dragons (2014–15)
- Auburn Pro Elite Flyers (2015–16)
- Big Texas (2012–14)
- Blue Ridge Bison (2013)
- Bull City Legacy (2013–16)
- Burlington Knights
- Carolina Gladiators (2012–14)
- Chapel Hill Blue Force (2015–16)
- Charlotte Elite (2015–16)
- Fayetteville Crossover (2012–14)
- Georgia Kings (2014–15)
- Greensboro Cobras (2013–16)
- HoopForLyfe (2013–16)
- Johnston County Nighthawks (2013)
- Lumberton Showstoppers (2014–16)
- Neuse River Basketball Club (2014)
- Palmetto Flight (2013–14)
- PrimeTime Players (2012–14)
- Queen City Express (2012–14)
- Raleigh Revolt (2014–16)
- Savannah Cavaliers (2015–16)
- South Carolina All Stars (2013–14)
- Triangle Run and Gun (2014–15)
- Winston-Salem Team Certified (2014–15)
- Wilmington Sea Dawgs (2012–16)

== Champions ==
Year	Champion	Runner-up	Score
2012	PrimeTime Players	Cary Invasion	123-102
2013	PrimeTime Players	Cary Invasion	126-118
2014	PrimeTime Players	Cary Invasion	128-107
2014-15	Raleigh Revolt	Charlotte Elite	137-102
2015-16	Raleight Revolt	Charlotte Elite	112-109
