= Gary Perry =

American politician

- In office 2003–2010

Personal details
- Party: Republican

Gary Perry is an American civil engineer and politician from the state of Montana. He was a Republican candidate who served Senate District 35 from 2003 to 2010.

Perry is from Manhattan, Montana, and owns his own business. He was elected to the Montana Senate in 2002 and reelected in 2006. He left the chamber after the 2010 elections due to term limits. He was running for Governor of Montana in the 2020 Montana gubernatorial election. He was endorsed by Montana Shooting Sports Association. He later dropped out of the race.
