= East Coast Basketball League =

Minor American basketball league

East Coast Basketball League (ECBL)
- Sport: Basketball
- Founded: June 2014
- First season: 2015
- No. of teams: 21
- Country: United States
- Continent: FIBA Americas (Americas)
- Most recent champions: Carolina Thunder (South); Hartford Shockers (Mid Atlantic) (2023)
- Most titles: Six (PrimeTime Players)
- Website: EastCoastBasketballLeague.org

East Coast Basketball League (ECBL) is a men's professional basketball minor league in the United States that began play in March 2015. The league is centered in the Carolinas with teams also in Georgia, Virginia, Maryland, Pennsylvania, Connecticut and Massachusetts.

== History ==
Five teams (Carolina Gladiators, Fayetteville Crossover, PrimeTime Players, Queen City Express, South Carolina All-Stars) in the ECBL previously played in the Tobacco Road Basketball League. The teams broke away from the TRBL due to changes in the league format.

On August 16, 2014, the ECBL announced the addition of the Fort Gordon Eagles. A military team, the Eagles also compete in the Southeast Military Athletics Conference (SEMAC) from October to February.

Former American Basketball Association team Savannah Storm were admitted to enter the ECBL for Season 1. They would be joined by Columbia Crusaders, Gastonia Crowns and High Point Hawks to round out the 10-team circuit.

The first-ever ECBL Championship was won by PrimeTime Players, 130–113 over the Fayetteville Crossover. The final was played on June 27, 2015, in Fort Mill, South Carolina and streamed live online. Former Catawba College forward Donald Rutherford scored 34 points while grabbing 16 rebounds for PrimeTime and was named game MVP.

Four new teams joined the ECBL for the 2016 season: expansion teams Carolina MPact, Petersburg Revolution, RDU Raptors and Winston-Salem Certified (formerly of the TRBL).

Expansion into Charlotte was announced on April 8, 2016, with the addition of Charlotte Golden Bulls.

At the August 2016 AGM, league board of directors unanimously accepted the expansion application of the Florence Wildcats for 2017. Two teams also announced name changes: Peterburg Cavaliers (formerly Revolution) and North Carolina Coyotes (formerly RDU Raptors).

League owners approved the expansion application of the Carolina Thunder for 2017. The Thunder began as a travel team playing a league schedule on the road. A second travel team, Hickory Hoyas, were added to the schedule before the season opener.

Prior to the 2021 season the league added seven teams to form the new Mid-Atlantic Conference. Teams included Fredericksburg Grizzlies, Hub City Hogs, Philly Cannons, Philly Raiders, Plaistow Shockers, Red Rose Thunder and Western Mass Zombies.

== Teams ==
Central Conference	City	Arena	Founded	First ECBL season
PrimeTime Players	Fort Mill, South Carolina	Legion Collegiate Academy	1991	2015
Winston-Salem Wolves	Winston-Salem, North Carolina	Forsyth Country Day Childress Center	2018	2019
Gastonia Snipers	Charlotte, North Carolina	Mountain Island Fitness	2018	2019
QC Vipers	Charlotte, North Carolina	Mountain Island Fitness	2024	2025
Charlotte Blue Jackets	Charlotte, North Carolina	Bette Rae Thomas Rec Center	2025	2026
Sparkle City Renegades	Spartanburg, South Carolina	TBA	2025	2026
Northern Conference	City	Arena	Founded	First ECBL season
Carolina Chosen Lions	Rocky Mount, North Carolina	Rocky Mount Prep	2018	2019
North Carolina Capitals	Raleigh, North Carolina	Garner Road Community Center	2020	2021
Petersburg Cavaliers	Petersburg, Virginia	Richard Bland College	2015	2016
North Carolina Coyotes	Durham, North Carolina	TBA	2017	2018
Goldsboro Wings	Goldsboro, North Carolina	Goldsboro Family YMCA	2024	2025
Park City Dreamers	Manassa, Virginia	Potomac Sr High School	2024	2025
Southern Conference	City	Arena	Founded	First ECBL season
Carolina Crusaders	Columbia, South Carolina	Glenforest School	2014	2015
Carolina Thunder	Hartsville, South Carolina	Coach D.B. Thomas Sports Center	2016	2017
Balling Brothers	Mullins, South Carolina	Dillon Wellness Center	2025	2026
Carolina Panthers	Florence, South Carolina	Pearl Monroe Rec Center	2018	2019
Kingdom Life Basketball Club	Waxhaw, North Carolina	Cuthbertson Middle School	2023	2024
South Carolina Upstate Redhawks	Greenville, South Carolina	Greenville First Baptist	2014	2015

=== Former teams ===
- Augusta Eagles (2015–20)
- Carolina Gladiators (2015)
- Carolina Kings (2017)
- Carolina MPact (2016)
- Carolina Showtime (2017; 2020)
- Charlotte Golden Bulls (2017)
- C-Port Trojans (2015–18)
- East Carolina Cardinals (2018–19)
- Fayetteville Crossover (2015–16)
- Fredericksburg Grizzlies (2021)
- Gastonia Crowns (2015)
- Georgia Fire (2020–21)
- Hickory Hoyas (2017–19; 2020–25)
- High Point Hawks (2015–17)
- Philly Cannons (2021)
- Queen City Express (2015)
- South Carolina All Stars (2015–18)
- Winston-Salem Certified (2016–18)
- Kannapolis Lycans (2020–22)
- North Carolina Coyotes (2017–22)
- Lehigh Valley Flight (2022)
- Coastal Elite Pirates (2021–23)
- Bishopville Devils (2022–23) Rebranded as QC Vipers in 2025
- Hampton Roads Warriors (2017–20,2023)
- Florence Wildcats (2017–23)
- Western Mass Zombies (2021–23)
- Hub City Hogs (2021–23)
- Red Rose Thunder (2021–23)
- Nova Bulls (2022–23)
- Charlotte Tribe (2017-24)
- Rowan County Bulls (2017-25)
- DC Heat (2023-25)
- Philly Raiders (2021-25)

== Champions ==
Season	Champion	Runner-up	Result
2015	PrimeTime Players	Fayetteville Crossover	130-113
2016	PrimeTime Players	Fayetteville Crossover	119-100
2017	PrimeTime Players	Carolina Thunder	123-105
2018	PrimeTime Players	Hickory Hoyas	134-118
2019	PrimeTime Players	Winston-Salem Wolves	103-99
2020	none (season suspended due to COVID-19)	---	---
2021: South 2021: Mid-Atlantic	PrimeTime Players Western Mass Zombies	North Carolina Coyotes Hub City Hogs	130-128 122-117 (OT)
2022: South 2022: Mid-Atlantic	Petersburg Cavaliers Hartford Shockers	Carolina Crusaders Hub City Hogs	134-124 125-114
2023: South 2023: Mid-Atlantic	Carolina Thunder Hartford Shockers	Petersburg Cavaliers The DC Heat	126-102 134-120
2024	DC Heat	Carolina Thunder	115-102
2025	DC Heat	Carolina Thunder	111-93

== ECBL Super Cup ==
Winners of the ECBL Mid-Atlantic and ECBL South.

ECBL Super Cup
Year	Winner	Runner-up	Result	Location
2021	PrimeTime Players	Western Mass Zombies	133-129	Combine Academy, Lincolnton, North Carolina
2022	Hartford Shockers	Petersburg Cavaliers	130-110	Hartford, CT
