= Cary Invasion =

Minor-league professional basketball team in Cary, North Carolina

- Founded: 2011
- League: CBL (2011); TRBL (2011–present)
- Team history: Cary Invasion (2011–present)
- Based in: Cary, North Carolina
- Arena: Herbert Young Community Center
- Colors: Black, Green
- Owner: Terry 'Doc' Thorne
- Head coach: Erasto Hacthett
- Championships: 1 (2011 CBL)

Uniforms
home	away

The Cary Invasion is a minor-league professional basketball team based in Cary, North Carolina, that began play in 2011 as a member of the Continental Basketball League (CBL) and later joined the Tobacco Road Basketball League (TRBL) and the Premiere Basketball League (PBL). Home games are played at the Herbert Young Community Center in Downtown Cary.

== 2011–2012 ==
After winning the CBL championship in their inaugural season, the team announced (with the Wilmington Sea Dawgs) the formation of the Tobacco Road Basketball League and their membership therein.

The Invasion finished second in the TRBL, but lost in the championship game to the PrimeTime Players after besting the Wilmington Sea Dawgs in the semi-final. Head coach Marqus Johnson stepped down for a college coaching position and was replaced by Chris La Rocca, who lasted a short time and was then replaced by current head coach Erasto Hatchett.

== Season-by-season records ==
Cary Invasion
Year	Regular Season		Postseason		
Year	Record	Win %	Record	Win %	Result
Continental Basketball League (2011)
2011	11–1	.917	1-0	.000	Championship - Won vs. Florida Flight 131-103
Tobacco Road Basketball League (2012–present)
2012	9–3	.750	1-1	.500	Semifinals - Won vs. Wilmington Sea Dawgs 127-104; Championship - Lost vs. PrimeTime Players 103-123
2013	11–0	1.000	1-1	.500	Semifinals - Won vs. Team HoopForLyfe 150-144 (3OT); Championship - Lost vs. PrimeTime Players 118-126
Totals	31–4	.886	3–2	.600	1 Championship
