= Joe and Barbara Schwartz Center =

Multi-purpose arena in Wilmington, North Carolina

Coordinates: 34.2419016°N 77.9495098°W

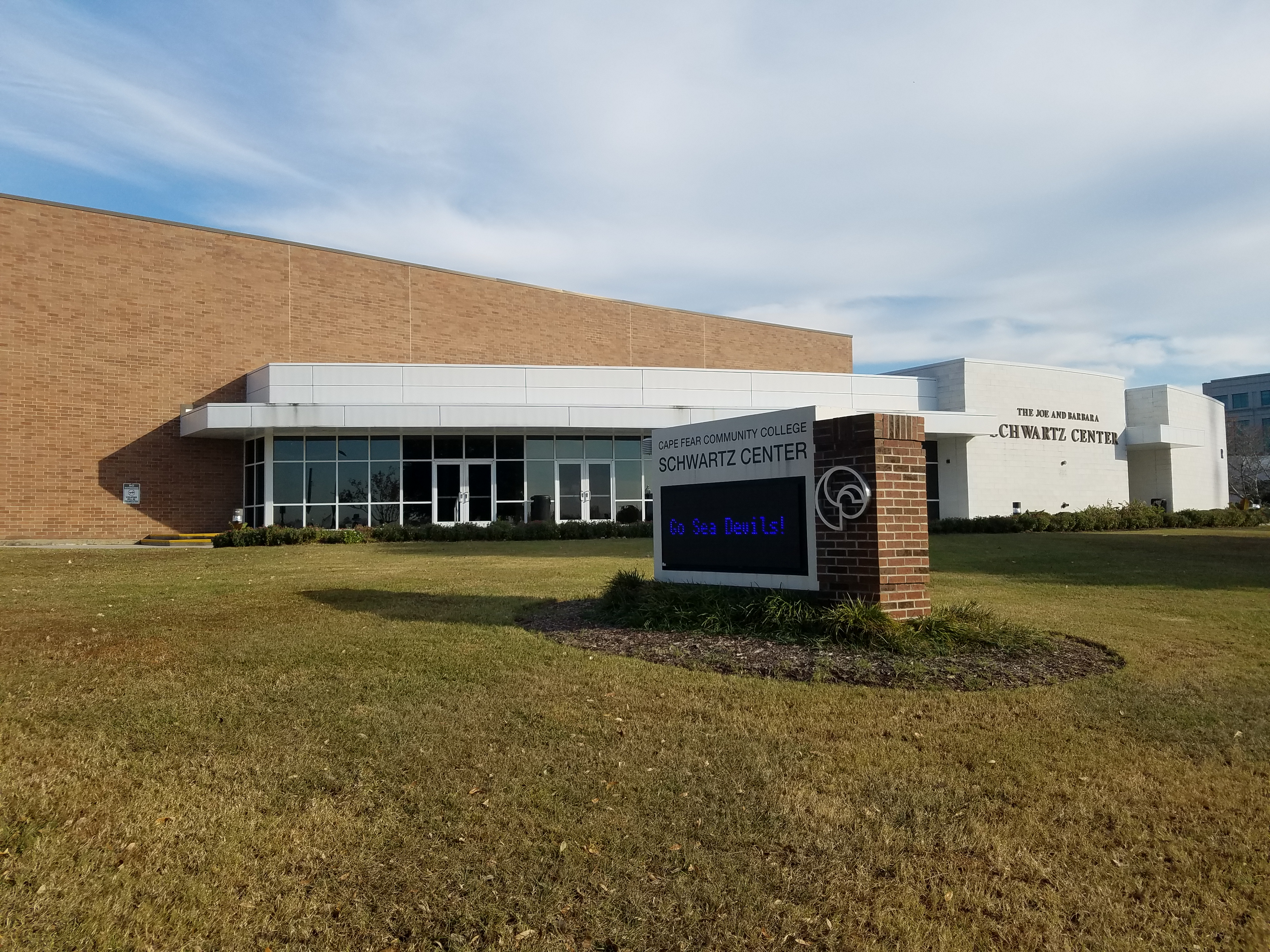
Main entrance to the center

The Joe and Barbara Schwartz Center is a multi-purpose arena on the campus of Cape Fear Community College in Wilmington, North Carolina. With a capacity of 1,800 people, it is home to the Cape Fear Sea Devils junior college basketball and volleyball teams. The arena was completed in October 2000.
