= Miami Midnites =

Professional minor-league basketball team in Miami, Florida

- Founded: 2014
- League: FBA (2014-present); ABA (2014-present)
- Team history: Miami Midnites (2014-present)
- Based in: Davie, Florida
- Arena: David Posnack Jewish Community Center
- Colors: Yellow, Orange
- Owner: Jeffrey Rosen
- Head coach: Damon Wilcox
- Championships: 2 (2014, 2015-FBA)

The Miami Midnites are a professional minor league basketball team based in Miami, Florida. Established in 2014, the club was an affiliate of the Maccabi Haifa B.C. of the Israeli Basketball Premier League. The team is owned by Jeffrey Rosen, CEO of Triangle Entertainment.

== History ==
Competing in the Florida Basketball Association, the Midnites named Florida Hall of Fame coach Marcos '"Shakey" Rodriguez its first head coach in April 2014. After an 11–1 regular season, Miami defeated Palm Beach Knights (141–121) in the FBA Playoff semifinals before capturing the league championship against Tampa Bay Rebels 98-82 on August 10, 2014.

After the FBA Summer season, Miami Midnites joined the American Basketball Association for the 2014–15 season. Miami were members of the ABA Southeast Division.

In their first season competing in the ABA Miami advanced through the league playoffs before losing in the ABA Championship to Shreveport-Bossier Mavericks.

== Season-by-season ==
Season	League	W	L	Finish	Playoff results
2014	FBA	11	1	1st	Won FBA championship
2014-15	ABA	17	3	2nd, Southeast Division	Runner-up (lost to Shreveport-Bossier Mavericks)
2015	FBA	12	0	1st	Won FBA championship
2015-16	ABA	24	4	2nd, Florida Division	Semifinals (lost to Windy City Groove)
2016	FBA	7	1	1st	Won FBA Championship

== Notable players ==
- Yoav Saffar (born 1975), Israeli basketball player
