= List of people from Florida =

State flag of Florida

Location of Florida in the United States

This is a list of notable people who were born, raised, or spent significant time living in or being in the U.S. state of Florida.

== Business ==
Name	Notability	Connection to Florida
Paul Bilzerian (1950–)	financier convicted of securities fraud	Born in Miami
Sara Blakely (1971–)	Businesswoman; founder and owner of SpanxFlorida State University	Born in Clearwater
James J. Greco (1958–)	Businessman; chief executive officer and president of Sbarro	Lives in Boynton Beach
Wayne Huizenga (1937–2018)	Businessman; founder of Blockbuster Video, AutoNation, Waste Management, Inc.; owner or co-owner of the Miami Dolphins of the National Football League, the Florida Panthers of the National Hockey League, and the Florida Marlins of Major League Baseball	Graduated from Pine Crest School in Fort Lauderdale in 1956; Founded Waste Management, Inc. in Fort Lauderdale in 1971
Robert James (1909–1983)	Businessman; founder of Raymond James Financial, an S&P 500-listed financial services company headquartered in St. Petersburg	Founded Raymond James Financial in St. Petersburg in 1962
Thomas James (1942/43–)	Businessman; chairman of Raymond James Financial, an S&P 500-listed financial services company headquartered in St. Petersburg	Lives in St. Petersburg; graduated from Stetson College of Law in St. Petersburg
George W. Jenkins (1907–1996)	Businessman; founder of Publix	Founded Publix in Winter Haven in 1930 and resided in Lakeland until his death in 1996
Jeffrey Rosen	President of Rose Art Industries, owner of Maccabi Haifa, and owner of the Miami Midnites	Owner of Miami Midnites
Chip Skowron (1968/69–)	Hedge fund manager convicted of insider trading	Born in Cocoa

== Politics and government ==
Name	Notability	Connection to Florida
Jeb Bush (born 1953)	Former governor of Florida (1999–2007); brother of former president George W. Bush	Lived in Miami
Ron DeSantis (born 1978)	46th governor of Florida (2019–)	Born in Jacksonville
Nate Douglas (born 2000)	Politician and educator	Born in Celebration, lives in Orlando
Randy Fine (born 1974)	Gambling industry executive, U.S. congressman from Florida (2025–)	
J. Dudley Goodlette (born 1948)	Florida state representative (1999–2007)	Lived in Naples
Abraham Katz (1926–2013)	Diplomat, United States ambassador to the OECD	
Bill Nelson (born 1942)	Former U.S. senator from Florida (2001–2019), former U.S. congressman from Florida (1979–1991), NASA administrator (2021–2025)	Born in Miami
Janet Reno (1938–2016)	U.S. attorney general, 1993–2001; first woman to serve as attorney general	Born in Miami
Marco Rubio (born 1971)	U.S. senator from Florida 2011–2025; U.S. secretary of state (2025–),30th United States National Security Advisor (Acting: May 1, 2025 – September 22, 2026) (September 22, 2026-Present)	Born in Miami
Donald Trump (born 1946)	45th & 47th President of the United States (2017–2021, 2025–), businessman	Lives in Palm Beach
Mike Waltz (born 1974)	32nd United States Ambassador to the United Nations(September 2025 - present),29th U.S. national security advisor (January 2025-May 2025), Former U.S. congressman from Florida (2019–2025)	Born in Boynton Beach
Byron Donalds	Governor elect of florida (5 January 2027)	

== Film and television ==
Name	Notability	Connection to Florida
Kirsten Bloom Allen	Actress and ballet dancer	Joined the Orlando Ballet and graduated from Melbourne High School
Elizabeth Ashley (1939–)	Film and television actress	Born in Ocala
Angela Bassett (1958–)	Film and television actress	Lived in St. Petersburg
Matt Battaglia (1965–)	Film and television actor, producer, philanthropist	Born in Tallahassee
Steven Bauer (1956–)	Film and television actor	Grew up in Miami
Amanda Bearse (1958–)	Film and television actress	Born in Winter Park
Shannon Bream (1971–)	Reporter and anchor for Fox News	Grew up in Tallahassee
Delta Burke (1956–)	Television actress	Born in Orlando
Tom Byrd (1960–)	Television actor (NBC's Boone)	Born in Philippine Islands; raised in Florida
Maria Canals-Barrera (1966–)	Film and television actress	Born in Miami
Diana Canova (1953–)	Actress	Born in West Palm Beach
David Caruso (1956–)	Film and television actor	Lives in Miami Beach
Noah Centineo (1996–)	Actor and model	Born in Miami
Jonathan Chase (1979–)	Film and television actor	Born in Plantation
Merian C. Cooper (1893–1973)	Film director, screenwriter, and producer	Born in Jacksonville
Matt Damon (1970–)	Film actor	Lived in Miami
Brittany Daniel (1976–)	Television and film actress	Born in Gainesville
Brad Davis (1949–1991)	Film actor	Born in Tallahassee
Johnny Depp (1963–)	Film actor	Raised in Miramar
Dimitri Diatchenko (1968–2020)	Film and television actor	Lived in Holly Hill and Daytona Beach
Creagen Dow (1991–)	Film and television actor	Born in Sebring
Faye Dunaway (1941–)	Academy Award-winning actress	Born in Bascom
Gail Edwards (1952–)	Film and television actress	Born and raised in Coral Gables
Raúl Esparza (1970–)	Film, television, and stage actor	Born in Miami
Stepin Fetchit (1902–1985)	Film actor and comedian	Born in Key West
Jorja Fox	Television actress	Lived in Melbourne Beach
Megan Fox (1986–)	Film and television actress	Partly raised in St. Petersburg
Josh Gad (1981–)	Film actor, comedian, and singer best known for voicing Olaf from Frozen	Born in Hollywood
Aidan Gallagher (1969–)	Film and television actor	Born in Tallahassee
Robert Gant (1968–)	Television actor	Born in Tampa
Andy Garcia (1956–)	Film actor	Born in Cuba; raised in Miami
Joanna García (1979–)	Film and television actress	Born in Tampa
Matt Gerald (1970–)	Film and television actor	Born in Miami
Malcolm Gets (1963–)	Actor	Born in Gainesville
Skyler Gisondo (1996–)	Film and television actor	Born in Palm Beach County
Julie Gonzalo (1981–)	Film and television actress	Raised in Miami
Mel Gorham (1959–)	Film and television actress	Born in Coral Gables
Ashley Greene (1987–)	Film and television actress	Born in Jacksonville
Carla Gugino (1973–)	Film and television actress	Born in Sarasota
Tony Hale (1970–)	Film and television actor	Born in Tallahassee
Darrell Hammond (1955–)	Comedian from Saturday Night Live; actor	Born in Melbourne
Gina Hecht (1953–)	Television and film actress	Born in Winter Park
Wanda Hendrix (1928–1981)	Film actress	Born in Jacksonville
Catherine Hickland (1956–)	Soap opera actress	Born in Fort Lauderdale
Cheryl Hines (1965–)	Actress	Born in Miami Beach
Crystal Hunt (1985–)	Soap opera actress	Born in Clearwater
Jonathan Jackson (1982–)	Actor	Born in Orlando
Victoria Jackson (1959–)	Film and television actress	Born in Miami
Carter Jenkins (1991–)	Film and television actor	Born in Tampa
Sarah Jones (1983–)	Film and television actress	Born in Winter Springs
Victoria Justice (1993–)	Actress, singer	Born in Hollywood
Lawrence Kasdan (1949–)	Film director and screenwriter	Born in Miami
Arielle Kebbel (1985–)	Film and televistion actress	Born in Winter Park
Catherine Keener (1960–)	Actress	Born in Miami
David Labrava (1962–)	Writer and actor	Born in Miami
Beth Littleford (1968–)	Film and television actress	Grew up in Winter Park
Jennifer Lopez (1969–)	Singer and actress	Lived in Miami
Josie Loren (1987–)	Television actress	Born in Miami
Vinicius Machado (1982–)	Film and television actor	Raised in Orlando
William H. Macy (1950–)	Film actor	Born in Miami
Chris Marquette (1984–)	Film and television actor	Born in Stuart
Natalie Martinez (1984–)	Model and actress	Born in Miami
Velia Martínez (1920–1993)	Actress and singer	Born in Tampa
DeLane Matthews (1961–)	Television actress	Born in Rockledge
Butterfly McQueen (1911–1995)	Film and television actress	Born in Tampa
Julio Oscar Mechoso (1955–)	Film and television actor	Born in Miami
Leighton Meester (1986–)	Film and television actress	Born in Marco Island
Eva Mendes (1974)	Film actress	Born in Miami
Katy Mixon (1981–)	Film and television actress	Born in Pensacola
Mandy Moore (1984–)	Actress and singer-songwriter	Grew up in Longwood
Jessica Morris (1980–)	Soap opera actress	Born in Jacksonville
Enrique Murciano (1973–)	Film and television actor	Born in Miami
Chris Núñez (1973–)	Tattoo artist and subject of TLC's Miami Ink	Born in Miami Beach
Victor Nuñez (1945–)	Film director	Born in DeLand
Flip Pallot (died 2025)	Television personality	From Florida
Sarah Paulson (1974–)	Film, stage and television actress	Born in Tampa
Kimberly Peirce (1967–)	Film director	Born in Miami
Carlos Pena Jr. (1989–)	Television actor and singer	Born in Weston
Gina Philips (1975–)	Film and television actress	Born in Miami Beach
Summer Phoenix (1978–)	Actress and model	Born in Winter Park
Danny Pino (1974–)	Film and television actor	Born and raised in Miami
Sidney Poitier (1927–2022)	Academy Award-winning actor	Born in Miami
Brett Ratner (1969–)	Film and music video director	Born and raised in Miami Beach
Monica Raymund (1986–)	Television actress	Born in St. Petersburg
Riley Reid (1991–)	Pornographic actress	Born in Miami Beach
Ashley Rickards (1992–)	Television actress	Born in Sarasota
Genesis Rodriguez (1987–)	Television actress	Born in Miami
Maggie Rodriguez (1969–)	Co-anchor of CBS's The Early Show	Born in Miami
Stephen Root (1951–)	Film and television actor	Born in Sarasota
Bob Ross (1942–1995)	Television presenter and artist	Born in Daytona Beach
Mickey Rourke (1952–)	Film actor	Raised in Miami
Maya Rudolph (1972–)	Film and television actress	Born in Gainesville
Rick Sanchez (1958–)	Host of CNN's Rick's List	Grew up in Hialeah
Pat Skipper (1958–)	Film and television actor	Born in Lakeland
Wesley Snipes (1962–)	Actor and film producer	Born in Orlando
Rachel Specter (1980–)	Film and television actress	Born in Tampa
Kirsten Storms (1984–)	Television actress	Born in Orlando
Bella Thorne (1997–)	Television actress	Born in Hollywood, Florida
Daniel Tosh (1975–)	Television comedian	Born in Germany; raised in Titusville
Wilmer Valderrama (1980–)	Film and television actor	Born in Miami
Alexa Vega (1988–)	Film and television actress	Born in Miami
Ben Vereen (1946–)	Actor, dancer and singer	Born in Miami
Sofía Vergara (1972–)	Film and television actress	Lives in Miami
Bob Vila (1946–)	Television home improvement personality	Born in Miami
Dave Williamson	Stand-up comedian	Born in Miami
Hugh Wilson (1943–2018)	Film director	Born in Miami

== Literature ==
Name	Notability	Connection to Florida
T.D. Allman (1944–)	Exposed CIA secret involvement with the war in Laos and interviews with world figures; historian author of Finding Florida: The True History of the Sunshine State and Miami: City of the Future	Born in Tampa
Kristen Arnett (1980–)	Fiction author and essayist; her debut novel, Mostly Dead Things, was a New York Times bestseller	Born, raised, and lives in Orlando
Dave Barry (1947–)	Pulitzer Prize-winning columnist and best-selling author	Lives in Miami
Shmuley Boteach (1966–)	Best-selling author of 31 books including Kosher Sex and Kosher Jesus, Orthodox rabbi, radio and television host	Lived in Miami
Pat Frank (1907–1964)	Author of Alas, Babylon	Lived in Tangerine
Ernest Hemingway	Author	Lived in Key West
Carl Hiaasen (1953–)	Journalist and novelist	Born in Plantation
Zora Neale Hurston (1891–1960)	Author and folklorist during the Harlem Renaissance	Raised in Eatonville
James Weldon Johnson (1871–1938)	Author, poet, and civil rights activist	Born in Jacksonville
Stetson Kennedy (1916–2011)	Author of Palmetto Country and civil rights activist	Lived in Jacksonville and St. Augustine
David Nolan (1946–)	Author of Fifty Feet in Paradise: The Booming of Florida	Lives in St. Augustine
Marjorie Kinnan Rawlings (1896–1953)	Novelist and short story writer	Lived in Cross Creek, the setting for most of her work
Lillian Smith (1897–1966)	Author and social critic	Born in Jasper
Florence Duval West (1840–1881)	Poet	Born in Tallahassee, Florida

== Military ==
Name	Notability	Connection to Florida	
Chester R. Bender (1914–1996)	Superintendent, United States Coast Guard Academy: Commandant, US Coast Guard	Born in Burnsville, West Virginia;	lived in Plant City
Alan Stephenson Boyd (1922–2020)	First United States secretary of transportation	Born in Jacksonville	
Roy Geiger (1885–1947)	Marine Corps 4-star general during World War II	Born in Middleburg	
Joseph Kittinger (1928–)	Aviation and space flight pioneer	Born in Tampa	
John Young (1930–2018)	Navy fighter pilot and NASA Gemini, Apollo, and Space Shuttle astronaut	Raised in Orlando	

== Music ==
Name	Notability	Connection to Florida
9lokkNine	Rapper	Born in Orlando
Adassa	Reggaetón artist	Born in Miami
Steve Aoki (1977–)	DJ	Born in Miami
Birdman (1969–)	Rap artist	Lived in Miami Beach
Kodak Black (1997–)	Musician	Born in Pompano Beach
Gary U.S. Bonds (1939–)	Singer and songwriter	Born in Jacksonville
Pat Boone (1934–)	1950s rock and roll singer	Born in Jacksonville
Danielle Bregoli (2003–)	Rapper	Born in West Palm Beach
Brisco (1982–)	Rap artist	Born in Opa-locka
Ethel Cain (1998–)	Singer-songwriter	Born in Tallahassee, raised in Perry
Jo Ann Campbell (1938–)	Pop singer	Born in Jacksonville
Luther Campbell (1960–)	R&B singer	Born in Miami
Aaron Carter (1987–2022)	Singer	Born in Tampa
Nick Carter	Backstreet Boys singer	Lives in Tampa
Desmond Child (1953–)	Songwriter; singer; Songwriter's Hall of Fame	Born in Gainesville
Cool & Dre	Rap record producers and songwriters	Born or raised in Miami
Easton Corbin	Country music singer	Born in Trenton
Carter Cornelius (1948–1991)	R&B artist; lead singer of Cornelius Brothers and Sister Rose	Born in Dania
Christian Cuevas (1995–)	Pop rock singer-songwriter and contestant from NBC's The Voice season 11	Born in Orlando
Denzel Curry (1995–)	Rapper	Born in Miami
Christian Daniel (1984–)	Singer-songwriter and actor	Lives in Miami
Billy Daniels (1915–1988)	Big band singer and actor	Born in Jacksonville
Clint Daniels (1974–)	Country singer and writer	Born in Panama City
Jason Derülo (1989–)	Pop and R&B singer	Born in Miami
Diplo (1978–)	DJ and producer; co-creator and lead member of Major Lazer	Born in Mississippi; attended University of Central Florida, as well as residing in Florida for years
Fred Durst (1970–)	Lead singer of Limp Bizkit	Born in Jacksonville
Greg Eklund (1970–)	Drummer for Everclear	Born in Jacksonville
Gloria Estefan (1957–)	Singer	Born in Cuba; raised in Miami
Flo Rida (Tramar Dillard) (1979–)	Rapper and actor	Born in Opa-Locka
Willa Ford (1981–)	Pop singer	Born/raised in Ruskin
Ariana Grande (1993–)	Singer, songwriter, and actress	Born and raised in Boca Raton
Gunplay (1979–)	Rap artist	Moved to Carol City at age 10
Debbie Harry (1945–)	Vocalist, musician, actress, and lead singer of the new wave band Blondie	Born in Miami
Bertie Higgins (1944–)	Singer and songwriter	Born in Tarpon Springs
Brooke Hogan (1988–)	Singer and rapper	Born/Raised in Tampa
Ace Hood (1988–)	Rapper	Born in Port St. Lucie, raised in Deerfield Beach
Island Boys (2001–)	Brothers Kodiyakredd (Franky Venegas) and Flyysoulja (Alex Venegas), a hip hop duo who gained notoriety via the video sharing platform TikTok	Based in South Florida
Jacki-O (198?–)	Rap artist	Born in Miami
Lauren Jauregui	Singer of Fifth Harmony	Born and raised in Miami
J. Rosamond Johnson (1873–1954)	Composer and singer during the Harlem Renaissance	Born in Jacksonville
Georgette Jones (1970–)	Country music singer	Born in Lakeland
Josh Kaufman (1976–)	Indianapolis-based Soul singer-songwriter and winner of NBC's The Voice season 6	Born and raised in Sarasota until age 13
DJ Khaled (1975–)	DJ rap artist	Raised in Miami
Khia (1970–)	Rap artist	Born in Tampa
Sean Kingston (1990–)	Reggae fusion singer and rapper	Born in Miami
Frances Langford	Big Band singer and movie actress	Born in Lakeland
DJ Laz (Lazaro Mendez)	Rapper	Born in Miami
Lil Pump (Gazzy Garcia) (2000–)	Rap artist	Born in Miami
Lil Wayne (1982–)	Rap artist	Lived in Miami Beach
James MacDonough (1970–)	Bass guitarist	Born in Jacksonville
Raul Malo (1965–)	Country music singer-songwriter	Born in Miami
Ricky Martin (1971–)	Latin pop singer	Lived in Miami Beach
Mase (Mason Betha) (1977–)	Rap artist	Born in Jacksonville
AJ McLean (1978–)	Singer	Born in West Palm Beach
Thurston Moore (1958–)	Singer and guitarist of Sonic Youth	Born in Coral Gables
Jim Morrison (1943–1971)	Singer, songwriter, and poet	Born in Melbourne
Jake Owen (1981–)	Country music artist	Born in Vero Beach
Jaco Pastorius (1951–1987)	Jazz bassist, former member of Weather Report	Raised in Fort Lauderdale until his death
Tom Petty (1950–2017)	Musician	Born in Gainesville
Pitbull (1981–)	Rap artist and actor	Born in Miami
Pleasure P (1984–)	Singer	Raised in Broward
Plies (1976–)	Rap artist	Born in Fort Myers
Rick Ross (1977–)	Rap artist	Born in Carol City
Santaye	Singer-songwriter	Lives in Miami
Markus Schulz	DJ	Lives in Miami
Shakira (1977–)	Singer	Lives in Miami
Ski Mask The Slump God (1996–)	Rapper	Born in Fort Lauderdale
Sleeping with Sirens	Rock band	Lives in Orlando
Smitty (1982–)	Rap artist	Born in Miami
Smokepurpp (1997–)	Rap artist	Moved to Miami at age 3
Kyle Sokol (1974–)	Bass player for Rude Squad and Trust for Liars	Born and lives in Saint Petersburg
SpaceGhostPurrp (1991–)	Rapper	Born in Miami
SpotemGottem (2001–)	Rapper	Born in Jacksonville
Scott Stapp (1973–)	Singer and songwriter	Born in Orlando
Stitches (Phillip Nickolas Katsabanis) (1995–)	Rap artist	Born in Miami
T-Pain (1985–)	Rap artist	Born in Tallahassee
Tiësto (1969–)	DJ	Lived in Miami
Mel Tillis (1932–2017)	Country music singer and songwriter	Born in Dover
Pam Tillis (1957–)	Country music singer and songwriter	Born in Plant City
Johnny Tillotson (1939–)	Singer and songwriter	Born in Jacksonville
Trick Daddy (Maurice Young) (1975–)	Rap artist	Born in Sarasota
Trina (1974–)	Rap artist	Born in Miami
Claude "Butch" Trucks (1947–2017)	Drummer of the Allman Brothers Band	Born in Jacksonville
DJ Uncle Al (1969–2001)	DJ rap artist	Born in Miami
Donnie Van Zant (1952–)	Lead singer of .38 Special	Born in Jacksonville
Johnny Van Zant (1960–)	Lead singer of Lynyrd Skynyrd after his brother	Born in Jacksonville
Ronnie Van Zant (1948–1977)	Lead singer of Lynyrd Skynyrd	Born in Jacksonville
Vanilla Ice (Robert Van Winkle)	Rap artist	Moved to Miami at 16; lives in Wellington
Scooter Ward (1970–)	Lead singer of Cold	Born in Jacksonville
Danielle White (1992–)	Singer	Born in Bradenton
Nardo Wick (2001–)	Rapper	Born in Jacksonville
Wifisfuneral (1997–)	Rapper	Raised in Palm Beach
Pharrell Williams (1973–)	Singer	Lived in Miami
XXXTENTACION (1998–2018)	Rapper, singer, and songwriter	Born in Plantation
YNW Melly	Rapper	Born in Gifford

== Science and technology ==
Name	Notability	Connection to Florida
Anthony J. Arduengo, III (1952–)	Chemist and material scientist; discoverer of persistent carbene	Born in Tampa
Wendy Chung	Molecular and clinical geneticist	Born and raised in southern Florida
Philip Don Estridge (1937–1985)	Led the development of the IBM Personal Computer	Born in Jacksonville; lived and worked in Boca Raton
John Gorrie (1803–1855)	Inventor of mechanical cooling	Lived and worked in Apalachicola from 1833–onward
George Smoot (1945–2025)	Astrophysicist and cosmologist; recipient, 2006 Nobel Prize in Physics	Born in Yukon
John Archibald Wheeler (1911–2008)	Theoretical physicist	Born in Jacksonville

== Sports ==
Name	Notability	Connection to Florida
Gary Alexander (1969–)	Professional basketball player	Born in Jacksonville
Nate Allen (1987–)	Professional football safety	Born in Fort Myers
Ray Allen (1975–)	Professional basketball player	Lived in Miami
Aric Almirola (1984–)	NASCAR driver	Born in Tampa
Robert Andino (1984–)	Professional baseball shortstop	Born in Miami
Leati Joseph Anoaʻi (1985–)	Professional wrestler	Born in Pensacola
Gilbert Arenas (1982–)	Professional basketball player	Born in Tampa
J. P. Arencibia (1986–)	Professional baseball catcher	Born in Miami
Devin Aromashodu (1984–)	Professional football wide receiver	Born in Miami
Bronson Arroyo (1977–)	Professional baseball pitcher	Born in Key West
Chucky Atkins (1974–)	Professional basketball player	Born in Orlando
Alex Avila (1987–)	Professional baseball catcher	Born in Hialeah
Zach Banks (1997–)	Racing driver	Born in Miami
Antwan Barnes (1984–)	Professional football defensive end	Born in Miami
Daniel Berger (1993–)	Professional golfer	Born in Plantation
Jay Berger (1966–)	Professional tennis player; highest world ranking # 7	Lived in Key Biscayne and Jupiter
Kerry Blackshear Jr. (1997–)	Professional basketball player	
Sheila Bleck (1974–)	IFBB professional bodybuilder	Lives in Tampa
Richard Bleier (1987–)	Major League Baseball pitcher for the Boston Red Sox	Born in Davie
Chaim Bloom (1983–)	Senior VP of the Tampa Bay Rays	Lives in St. Petersburg
Wade Boggs (1958–)	Professional baseball third baseman	Lives in Tampa
Boof Bonser (1981–)	Professional baseball pitcher	Born in St. Petersburg
Blake Bortles (1992–)	Professional football quarterback	Born in Altamonte Springs, played at UCF and for the Jacksonville Jaguars
Chris Bosh (1984–)	Professional basketball player	Lived in Miami
Sébastien Bourdais (1979–)	Racing driver	Lives in St. Petersburg
Dwayne Bowe (1984–)	Professional football wide receiver	Born in Miami
Antonio Brown (1988–)	Professional football wide receiver	Born in Miami
Rakeem Buckles (1990–)	Professional basketball player	Born in Miami
Daniel Bukantz (1917–2008)	Four-time Olympic fencer	Lived in Sarasota
Brodrick Bunkley (1983–)	Professional football defensive tackle	Born in Tampa
Billy Butler (1986–)	Professional baseball player	Born in Orange Park
Rashad Butler (1983–)	Professional football offensive tackle	Born in Palm Beach Gardens
Dayana Cadeau (1966–)	Professional bodybuilder	Lives in Wilton Manors
Jose Canseco (1964–)	Major League Baseball outfielder	Raised in Miami
Steve Carlton (1944–)	Major League Baseball pitcher	Born in Miami
Ryan Carpenter (1991–)	Professional ice hockey forward	Born in Oviedo
Vince Carter (1977–)	Professional basketball player	Born in Daytona Beach
Kevin Cash (1977–)	Professional baseball catcher	Born in Tampa
Jamar Chaney (1986–)	Professional football linebacker	Born in Fort Pierce
John Chaney (1932–2021)	College basketball coach	Born in Jacksonville
Ross Chastain (1992–)	NASCAR driver	Born in Alva
Jakob Chychrun (1998–)	Professional ice hockey defenceman	Born in Boca Raton
Desmond Clark (1977–)	Professional football tight end	Born in Bartow
Audra Cohen (1986–)	Professional tennis player	Born in Plantation
Norris Coleman (1961–)	Professional basketball player	
Laveranues Coles (1977–)	Professional football player	Born in Jacksonville
Jim Courier (1970–)	Professional tennis player	Born in Sanford
Lisa Cross (1978–)	IFBB professional bodybuilder	Lived in Miami
Daunte Culpepper (1977–)	Professional football quarterback	Born in Ocala
Jeff Cunningham (1976–)	Professional soccer player	Lived in Crystal River
Johnny Damon (1974–)	Major League Baseball All-Star outfielder	Grew up in Orlando
Wade Davis (1985–)	Professional baseball pitcher	Born in Lake Wales
Ian Desmond (1985–)	Professional baseball shortstop	Born in Sarasota
Antonio Dixon (1985–)	Professional football defensive tackle	Born in Miami
Keyon Dooling (1980–)	Professional basketball player	Born in Fort Lauderdale
Caeleb Dressel (1996–)	Competitive swimmer; 2016 and 2020 Olympian	Born in Green Cove Springs
Amy Dumas (1975–)	Professional wrestler	Born in Fort Lauderdale
Elvis Dumervil (1984–)	Professional football linebacker	Born in Miami
David Duval (1971–)	Professional golfer	Born in Jacksonville
Dallas Eakins (1967–)	Professional ice hockey defenceman and head coach	Born in Dade City
Dave Eiland (1966–)	Professional pitching coach	Born in Dade City
Layla El (1977–)	Professional wrestler	Lived in Miami
Ed Elisma (1975–)	Professional basketball player	
Chris Evert (1954–)	Professional tennis player	Born in Fort Lauderdale
Solofa F. Fatu Jr. (1965–)	Professional wrestler	Lives in Central Osceola/Polk County
Brian Ferlin (1992–)	Professional ice hockey forward	Born in Jacksonville
Tonga 'Uli'uli Fifita (1959–)	Professional wrestler	Lives in Kissimmee
Bruce Fleisher (1948–2021)	Professional golfer	Lives in the Palm Beach Gardens area
Eric Foster (1985–)	Professional defensive tackle	Born in Homestead
Jared Frayer (1978–)	Freestyle wrestler at 2012 Summer Olympics	Born in Miami, grew up in Clearwater
Jeff Fulchino (1979–)	Professional baseball pitcher	Born in Titusville
William Gay (1985–)	Professional football cornerback	Born in Tallahassee
Alonzo Gee (1987–)	Professional basketball player	Born in Riviera Beach
Blake Geoffrion (1988–)	Professional ice hockey forward	Born in Plantation
Logan Gilbert (1997–)	Professional baseball pitcher	Born in Winter Park
Brian Ginsberg (1966–)	Gymnast	Born in Miami
Margie Goldstein-Engle (1958–)	Equestrian	Born in Wellington
Gio González (1985–)	Professional baseball pitcher	Born in Hialeah
Luis Gonzalez (1967–)	Professional baseball outfielder	Born in Tampa
Dwight Gooden (1964–)	Professional baseball pitcher	Born in Tampa
Richard Goodman (1987–)	Professional football wide receiver	Born in Fort Lauderdale
Tom Gordon (1967–)	Professional baseball pitcher	Born in Avon Park
Frank Gore (1983–)	Professional football player	Born in Miami, Florida
Shayne Gostisbehere (1993–)	Professional ice hockey defenceman	Born in Pembroke Pines
Brian Gottfried (1952–)	World No. 3-ranked singles and No. 2-ranked doubles tennis player	Lives in Ponte Vedra
Nick Green (1978–)	Professional baseball infielder	Born in Pensacola
Zack Greinke (1983–)	Professional baseball pitcher	Born in Orlando
Eric Griffin (1990–)	Professional basketball player	
Colette Guimond (1961–)	IFBB professional bodybuilder	Lives in New Port Richey
Al Harris (1974–)	Professional football cornerback	Born in Pompano Beach
Udonis Haslem (1980–)	Professional basketball player	Born in Miami
Garnet Hathaway (1991–)	Professional ice hockey forward	Born in Naples
Bob Hayes (1942–2002)	Track and field athlete and professional football player	Born in Jacksonville
Geno Hayes (1987–)	Professional football linebacker	Born and raised in Greenville
Mario Henderson (1984–)	Professional football offensive tackle	Born in Lehigh Acres
Derrick Henry (1994–)	Professional football running back	Born in Yulee
Ángel Hernández (1961–)	Baseball umpire	
Devin Hester (1982–)	Professional football wide receiver and punt returner	Born and raised in Riviera Beach
Dan Hinote (1977–)	Professional ice hockey forward and assistant coach	Born in Leesburg
Hulk Hogan (1953–2025)	Professional wrestler and television star	Raised in Tampa
Eric Hosmer (1989–)	Professional baseball first baseman	Born in South Miami
Jack Hughes (2001–)	Professional hockey player	Born in Orlando
Quinn Hughes (1999–)	Professional hockey player	Born in Orlando
Eric Hurley (1985–)	Professional baseball pitcher	Born in Jacksonville
Michael Irvin (1966–)	Professional football player	Born in Fort Lauderdale
Jamaal Jackson (1980–)	Professional football center	Born in Miami
Lamar Jackson (1997–)	Professional football quarterback	Born in Pompano Beach
Andrew Jacobson (1985–)	Major League Soccer player	Born in Fort Myers
LeBron James (1984–)	Professional basketball player	Lived in Miami
Val James (1957–)	Professional ice hockey forward	Born in Ocala
Max Jean-Gilles (1983–)	Professional football guard	Born in Miami
Colton Gordon (1998–)	Professional baseball pitcher	Born in St. Petersburg
Mike Jenkins (1985–)	Professional football player	Grew up in Bradenton
Andre Johnson (1981–)	Professional football wide receiver	Born in Miami
Ashleigh Johnson (1994–)	Professional water polo goalie; 2016 and 2020 Olympian	Born in Miami
Bruce Johnson (1987–)	Professional football cornerback	Born in Live Oak
Chris Johnson (1985–)	Professional football running back	Born in Orlando
Chris Johnson (1990–)	Professional basketball player	
Dwayne "The Rock" Johnson (1972–)	Professional wrestler and actor	Lives in Miami
Gartrell Johnson (1986–)	Professional football running back	Born in Miami
Howard Johnson (1960–)	Professional baseball player	Born in Clearwater
Chipper Jones (1972–)	Professional baseball third baseman	Born in DeLand
Hunter Jones (1984–)	Professional baseball pitcher	Born in Palm Beach Gardens
James Jones (1980–)	Professional basketball player	Born in Miami
Roy Jones Jr. (1969–)	Former boxing champion	Born in Pensacola
Solomon Jones (1984–)	Professional basketball player	Born in Eustis
Matt Joyce (1984–)	Professional baseball outfielder	Born in Tampa
Kelly Kelly (1987–)	Professional wrestler	Born in Jacksonville
Skip Kendall (1964–)	Professional golfer	Lives in Windermere
Howard Kendrick (1983–)	Professional baseball second baseman	Born in Jacksonville
Jeff Keppinger (1980–)	Professional baseball infielder	Born in Miami
Casey Kotchman (1983–)	Professional baseball first baseman	Born in St. Petersburg
Byron Krieger (1920–2015)	Fencer, NCAA champion; two-time Pan Am gold medalist; two-time Olympian; two-time Maccabiah Games gold medalist	Lived in Boca Raton
Tony La Russa (1944–)	Professional baseball manager	Born and raised in Tampa
Sean Labanowski (1992–)	Professional basketball player	
Matt LaPorta (1985–)	Professional baseball first baseman	Born in Port Charlotte
Debi Laszewski (1969–)	IFBB professional bodybuilder	Lives in Jupiter
Max Lazar (1999–)	Major League Baseball pitcher for the Philadelphia Phillies	Born in Coral Springs
Jesse Levine (1987–)	Professional tennis player	Lives in Boca Raton
Ray Lewis (1975–)	Professional football player	Born in Bartow; lived in Lakeland
Danell Leyva (1991–)	Gymnast; 2012 Olympic silver medalist, men's all-around	Raised in Miami
Jesse Litsch (1985–)	Professional baseball pitcher	Born in Pinellas Park
Ryan Lochte (1984–)	Swimmer, 12x Olympic medalist	Raised in Daytona Beach
Sid Luckman (1916–1998)	NFL Hall of Fame football player	Lived in Aventura
Zac MacMath (born 1991)	Soccer player	Born in St. Petersburg
Elliott Maddox (1947–)	Professional baseball outfielder	Lives in Coral Springs
Dave Magadan (1962–)	Professional baseball player	Born in Tampa
Olindo Mare (1973–)	Professional football placekicker	Born in Hollywood
Melanie Margalis (1991–)	Competitive swimmer; 2016 Olympian	Born in Clearwater
Caroline Marks (2002–)	Professional surfer; Olympian	Raised in Melbourne Beach
Tino Martinez (1967–)	Professional baseball player	Born in Tampa
Denise Masino (1968–)	IFBB professional bodybuilder	Lives in Fort Myers
Ricardo Mathews (1987–)	Professional football defensive tackle	Born in Jacksonville
Jeff Mathis (1983–)	Professional baseball catcher	Born in Marianna
Michelle McCool (1980–)	Former WWE wrestler	Born and lives in Palatka
Mark McCumber (1951–)	Professional golfer	Born in Jacksonville
Bryant McFadden (1981–)	Professional football cornerback	Born in Hollywood
Willis McGahee (1981–)	Professional football player	Born in Miami
Tracy McGrady (1979–)	Professional basketball player	Born in Bartow
B. J. McLeod (1983–)	NASCAR driver	Born in Wauchula
Jaycob Megna (1992–)	Professional ice hockey defenceman	Born in Plantation
Jayson Megna (1990–)	Professional ice hockey forward	Born in Fort Lauderdale
Jason Michaels (1976–)	Professional baseball outfielder	Born in Tampa
Joshua Moore (1988–)	Professional football cornerback	Born in Fort Lauderdale
DaJuan Morgan (1985–)	Professional football safety	Born in Riviera Beach
Santana Moss (1979–)	Professional football player	Born in Miami
Sinorice Moss (1983–)	Professional football wide receiver	Born in Miami
Alonzo Mourning (1970–)	Professional basketball player	Lived in Miami
John Ryan Murphy (1991–)	Professional baseball catcher	Born in Bradenton
Louis Murphy (1987–)	Professional football wide receiver	Born in St. Petersburg
Ryan Murphy (1995–)	Competitive swimmer; 2016 and 2020 Olympian	Grew up in Jacksonville
Brett Myers (1980–)	Professional baseball pitcher	Born in Jacksonville
Chris Myers (1981–)	Professional football lineman	Born in Miami
Naomi (1987–)	Professional wrestler	Born in Sanford
Mike Napoli (1981–)	Professional baseball catcher	Born in Hollywood
Joe Nemechek (1963–)	NASCAR driver	Born in Naples
Harry Newman (1909–2000)	Professional NFL All-Pro football quarterback	Lived in South Florida
Stephen Nicholas (1983–)	Professional football linebacker	Born in Jacksonville
Chad Ochocinco (1978–)	Professional football player	Born in Miami
Darren O'Day (1982–)	Professional baseball pitcher	Born in Jacksonville
Shaquille O'Neal (1972–)	Professional basketball player	Lived in Orlando
Rob Oppenheim (1980–)	Professional golfer	Lives near Orlando
Donna Orender (née Geils) (1957–)	College basketball player and Women's Pro Basketball League All-Star; WNBA president	Lives in Jacksonville Beach
Yaxeni Oriquen-Garcia (1966–)	IFBB professional bodybuilder	Lives in Miami Beach
Akwasi Owusu-Ansah (1988–)	Professional football safety	Born in Gainesville
Jonathan Papelbon (1980–)	Professional baseball pitcher	Grew up in Jacksonville
Dimitri Patterson (1983–)	Professional football cornerback	Born in Orlando
Eric Patterson (1983–)	Professional baseball outfielder	Born in Tallahassee
Kenny Phillips (1986–)	Professional football safety	Born in Miami
Ryan Pickett (1979–)	Professional football nose tackle	Born and raised in Zephyrhills
Jason Pierre-Paul (1989–)	Professional football defensive end	Born in Deerfield Beach
A. J. Pierzynski (1976–)	Professional baseball catcher	Raised in Orlando
Jim Presley (1961–)	Professional baseball third baseman	Born in Pensacola
Ryan Raburn (1981–)	Professional baseball outfielder	Born in Tampa
Tim Raines (1959–)	Professional baseball left fielder	Born in Sanford
Jay Ratliff (1981–)	Professional football nose tackle	Born in St. Petersburg
Chris Ray (1982–)	Professional baseball pitcher	Born in Tampa
David Reutimann (1970–)	NASCAR driver	Born in Zephyrhills
Jamal Reynolds (1979–)	Football defensive end	Played for Florida State University
Glen Rice Jr.	Professional basketball player	Born in Miami
Alex Rodriguez (1975–)	Professional baseball player	Partly raised in Miami
Sean Rodriguez (1985–)	Professional baseball second baseman	Born in Miami
Antrel Rolle (1982–)	Professional football free safety	Born in Homestead
Al Rosen (1924–2015)	Professional baseball player; MLB four-time All-Star; MVP; two-time home run champion	Lived in Miami
Yoav Saffar (1975–)	Professional basketball player	
Chris Sale (1989–)	Professional baseball pitcher	Born in Lakeland
Jarrod Saltalamacchia (1985–)	Professional baseball catcher	Born in West Palm Beach
Asante Samuel (1981–)	Professional football cornerback	Born in Fort Lauderdale
Deion Sanders (1967–)	Professional football cornerback	Born in Fort Myers
Warren Sapp (1972–)	Professional football player	Born in Orlando
Ossie Schectman (1919–2013)	Basketball player who scored the first basket in NBA history	Lived in Florida
Luke Scott (1978–)	Professional baseball player	Born in DeLand
Clint Session (1984–)	Professional football linebacker	Born in Pompano Beach
Maria Sharapova (1987–)	Professional tennis player	Lives in Bradenton
Derrick Sharp (1971–)	Professional basketball player	Born in Orlando
Darryl Sharpton (1988–)	Professional football linebacker	Born in Coral Gables
Lito Sheppard (1981–)	Professional football player	Born in Jacksonville
Scot Shields (1975–)	Professional baseball pitcher	Born in Fort Lauderdale
Tom Shields (1991–)	Competitive swimmer; 2016 and 2020 Olympian	Born in Panama City
Buck Showalter (1956–)	Professional baseball manager	Born in DeFuniak Springs
Brandon Siler (1985–)	Professional football linebacker	Born in Daytona Beach
Ernie Sims (1984–)	Professional football linebacker	Born in Tallahassee
Mike Sims-Walker (1984–)	Professional football wide receiver	Born in Orlando
Kelly Slater (1972–)	Professional surfer	Born in Cocoa Beach
Emmitt Smith (1969–)	Professional football player	Born in Pensacola
Geno Smith (1990–)	Professional football quarterback	Born in Miami
Kevin Smith (1986–)	Professional football running back	Born in Miami
Mike Smith (1959–)	Professional football head coach	Born in Daytona Beach
Rusty Smith (1987–)	Professional football quarterback	Born in Jacksonville
Chris Snelling (1981–)	Professional baseball outfielder	Born in North Miami
Harold Solomon (1952–)	Professional tennis player, ranked No. 5 in the world	Lives in Fort Lauderdale
Mose Solomon (1900–1966)	Professional baseball player	Lived in Miami
Denard Span (1984–)	Professional baseball center fielder	Born in Tampa
Frank Spellman (1922–2017)	Olympic weightlifter; 1948 gold medal, 75 kg	Lived in Gulf Breeze
Steve Spurrier (1945–)	Football player and coach	Born in Miami Beach
Matthew Stafford (1988–)	Professional football quarterback	Born in Tampa
Amar'e Stoudemire (1982–)	Professional basketball player	Born in Lake Wales
Steve Tannen (1948–)	Professional NFL football player	Born in Miami
Antonio Tarver (1968–)	Professional boxer	Born in Tampa
Din Thomas (1976–)	UFC fighter	Lives and trains in Port St. Lucie
Joanna Thomas (1976–)	IFBB professional bodybuilder	Lives in Fort Lauderdale
Willie Thornton (1986–)	Professional CFL football player	Born in Belle Glade
Danny Valencia (1984–)	Professional baseball player	Born in Miami
Jason Varitek (1972–)	Professional baseball catcher	Grew up in Longwood
Alan Veingrad (1963–)	Professional NFL football player	Raised in part in Miami
Betty Viana-Adkins (1971–)	IFBB professional bodybuilder	Lives in Miami Beach
Jonathan Vilma (1982–)	Professional football player	Born in Coral Gables
Dwyane Wade (1982–)	Professional basketball player	Lived in Miami
Tim Wakefield (1966–)	Professional baseball pitcher	Born in Melbourne
Corey Walden	Professional basketball player	
Neal Walk (1948–2015)	Professional NBA basketball player	Raised in Florida
Leon Washington (1982–)	Professional football running back	Born in Jacksonville
Leonard Weaver (1982–)	Professional football fullback	Born in Melbourne
Eric Weems (1985–)	Professional football wide receiver	Born in Daytona Beach
Dan Wheldon (1978–2011)	Racing driver	Born in England]; lived in St. Petersburg
Paul Wight (1972–)	Professional wrestler	Lives in Tampa
Scottie Wilbekin (1993–)	Professional basketball player	
Vince Wilfork (1981–)	Professional football nose tackle, 2x Super Bowl Champion with the New England Patriots	Born and raised in Boynton Beach
Bobby Wilson (1983–)	Professional baseball catcher	Born in Dunedin
Major Wright (1988–)	Professional football safety	Born in Miramar
LeeRoy Yarbrough (1938–1984)	NASCAR driver	Born in Jacksonville
Sam Young (1987–)	Professional football quarterback	Born in Coral Springs

- Eli Abaev (born 1998), American-Israeli basketball player for Hapoel Be'er Sheva in the Israeli Basketball Premier League
- Jodi Appelbaum-Steinbauer (born 1956), professional tennis player
- José Bautista (born 1964), Major League Baseball (MLB) pitcher
- Alexis Blokhina (born 2004), tennis player
- Ashlee Bond (born 1985), American-Israeli Olympic show jumping rider who competes for Israel
- Zack Bryant (born 1997), basketball player in the Israeli Basketball Premier League
- Angela Buxton (1934–2020), English tennis player
- Joe Chealey (born 1995), basketball player in the Israeli Basketball Premier League
- Paul DeJong (born 1993), Major League Baseball infielder for the San Francisco Giants
- Toney Douglas (born 1986), basketball player for Hapoel Eilat of the Israeli Basketball Premier League
- David Efianayi (born 1995), basketball player in the Israeli Basketball Premier League, raised in Orlando
- Ronald Green (1944–2012), American-Israeli basketball player, born in Miami Beach
- Max Greyserman (born 1995), professional golfer on the PGA Tour
- Dalton Guthrie (born 1995), MLB player for the San Francisco Giants
- Justin James (born 1997), basketball player in theIsraeli Basketball Premier League
- Shawn Jones (born 1992), basketball player for Hapoel Haifa of the Israeli Basketball Premier League
- Maurice Kemp (born 1991), basketball player in the Israeli Basketball Premier League
- Evan Kravetz (born 1996), Major League Baseball pitcher for the Cincinnati Reds
- Jack Langer (born 1948/49), basketball player and investment banker
- Barry Leibowitz (born 1945), American-Israeli basketball player in the American Basketball Association and the Israeli Basketball Premier League
- Cameron Long (born 1988), basketball player
- Dov Markus (born 1946), Israeli-American soccer player, lives in Boynton Beach
- Ed Rubinoff (born 1935), tennis player
- David Schneider (born 1955), South African-Israeli tennis player
- Emanuel Sharp (born 2004), American-Israeli basketball player
- Andrew Smith (born 1992), American-Latvian basketball player in the Israeli Basketball Premier League
- Speedy Smith (born 1993), basketball player for Hapoel Jerusalem of the Israeli Basketball Premier League

== Other ==
Name	Notability	Connection to Florida
G. Harold Alexander (1900–1987)	Florida Republican Party state chairman (c. 1952–1964)	Resided in Fort Myers
John Atchison (1954–2007)	Assistant U.S. attorney and children's sports coach, committed suicide in prison after being charged with soliciting sex from a five-year-old girl	Resided in Gulf Breeze
Carrot Top (1965–)	Prop comedian	Born in Cocoa Beach
Fabiano Caruana (1992–)	Youngest chess grandmaster in United States history	Born in Miami
Rick Dees (1950–)	Radio personality	Born in Jacksonville
Janice Dickinson (1955–)	Early supermodel	Born in Hollywood
Tiffany Fallon (1974–)	Playboy Playmate of the Year (2005)	Born in Fort Lauderdale
Aaron Fechter (1953–)	Creator of The Rock-afire Explosion, co-founder of ShowBiz Pizza Place	Lives and works in Orlando
Abraham Lincoln Lewis (1865–1947)	Businessman and Florida's first African-American millionaire	Born in Madison
Adam Lovell (1977–)	Founder of WriteAPrisoner.com	Lives and works in Edgewater
Charles E. Merrill (1885–1956)	Founder of Merrill Lynch	Born in Green Cove Springs
Kara Monaco (1983–)	Playboy Playmate of the Year (2006)	Born in Lakeland
Carolyn Murphy (1973–)	Supermodel	Born in Fort Walton Beach
Chris Myers (1959–)	Sportscaster	Born in Miami
Kathleen Parker (1952–)	Syndicated columnist	Grew up in Winter Haven
A. Philip Randolph (1889–1979)	Civil rights activist	Born in Crescent City
Adin Ross (2000–)	Twitch streamer	Born in Boca Raton
Jason Schappert	Aviator, flight instructor	Lives in Ocala
Louis H. Schiff (1955–)	Broward County judge	Lives in Broward County
Krissy Taylor (1978–1995)	Model	Born in Miami
Niki Taylor (1975–)	Model	Born in Miami
Norman Thagard (1943–)	NASA astronaut	Lives and works in Tallahassee
Hugo Vihlen (1931–)	Record-breaking solo sailor	Born in Florida; lived in Homestead
Jimmy Wales (1966–)	Founding member of the Wikimedia Foundation	Resided in St. Petersburg
Roger L. Worsley (1937–)	Higher education administrator, president of Laredo Community College and chancellor of Southern Arkansas University Tech	Resident of The Villages in Sumter County since 2011

== Foreign-born Floridians ==
Name	Notability	Connection to Florida
Alia Atkinson (1988–)	Competitive swimmer; 2004, 2008, 2012, 2016 and 2020 Olympian	Born in Jamaica, partly raised in and lives in Pembroke Pines
Camila Cabello (1997–)	Singer and former member of Fifth Harmony	Born in Cuba and raised in Miami
Mark Consuelos (1970–)	Television actor and husband of Kelly Ripa	Born in Spain and lived in Tampa
Gloria Estefan (1957–)	Grammy Award-winning singer	Born in Cuba and raised in Miami
José Fernandez (1992–2016)	Professional baseball pitcher	Born in Cuba and later moved to Tampa
Don Francisco (1940–)	Popular television personality from Telemundo	Born in Chile and lives in Miami
Enrique Iglesias (1975–)	Pop singer-songwriter and son of Spanish music legend Julio Iglesias	Born in Spain and raised in Miami
Mark Meadows (1959–)	U.S. representative from North Carolina (2013–2020) and White House Chief of Staff (2020–2021)	Born in France and raised in Brandon
Tim Tebow (1987–)	Professional baseball outfielder and former football quarterback	Born in the Philippines and raised in Jacksonville
Malu Trevejo (2002–)	Singer	Born in Cuba and moved to Miami at age 13
Carlos Valdés (1989–)	Actor and singer known for his role as Cisco Ramon in the television series The Flash	Born in Colombia and raised in Miami

== See also ==
- List of people from Fort Lauderdale, Florida
- List of people from Jacksonville, Florida
- List of people from Miami
- List of people from Orlando, Florida
- List of people from Pensacola, Florida
- List of people from St. Petersburg, Florida
- List of people from Tampa, Florida
- List of people from Tallahassee, Florida
- List of University of Miami alumni
- List of Florida International University people
- List of Florida suffragists
