= Miami Seaquarium =

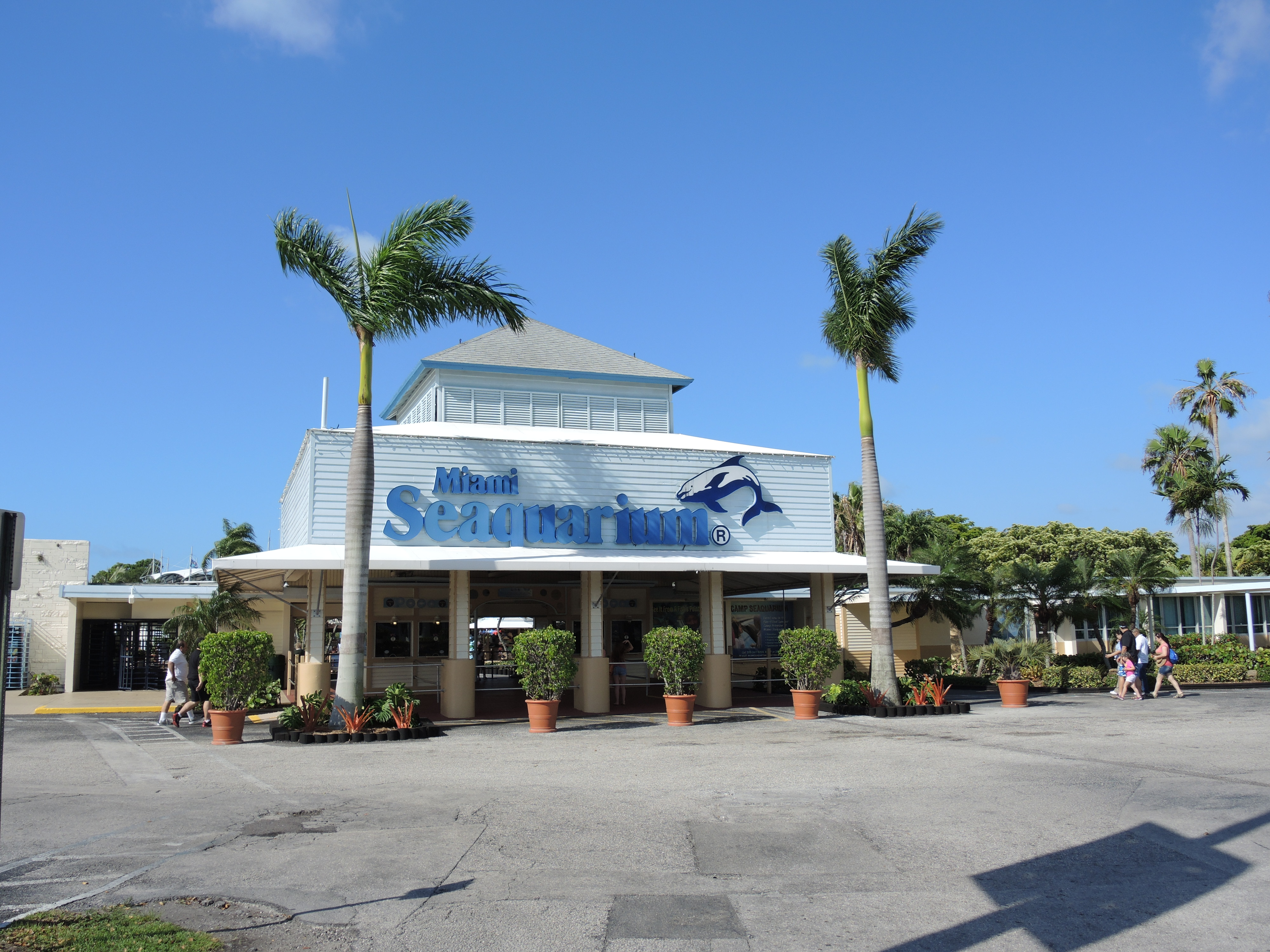
- Main entrance
- Interactive map of Miami Seaquarium
- 25.733°N 80.165525°W
- Date opened: September 24, 1955; 70 years ago
- Date closed: October 12, 2025; 10 months ago
- Location: Virginia Key, Miami, Florida, US
- Land area: 38 acres (15 ha)
- Annual visitors: 500,000
- Owner: Miami-Dade County
- Management: The Dolphin Company (operator/lessee)
- Website: miamiseaquarium.com

The Miami Seaquarium was a 38-acre (15 ha) oceanarium located on the island of Virginia Key in Biscayne Bay, Miami-Dade County, Florida, located near downtown Miami. The seaquarium closed after 70 years of operation on October 12, 2025.

Founded in 1955, it was one of the oldest continuously operating oceanariums in the United States. In addition to marine mammals, the Miami Seaquarium housed fish, sharks, sea turtles, birds, and reptiles. The park offered daily presentations and hosted overnight camps, events for boy scouts, and group programs. Over 500,000 people visited the facility annually. The park had around 225 employees, and its lease payments and taxes made it the third-largest contributor to Miami-Dade County's revenue.

== History ==
The park was founded by Fred D. Coppock and Captain W.B. Gray and was the second marine-life attraction in Florida. When it opened in 1955, it was the largest marine-life attraction in the world.

The park's first orca was Hugo, named after Hugo Vihlen. Hugo was captured in February 1968 in Vaughn Bay. Shortly after his capture, Hugo was flown to the Miami Seaquarium where he was held in a small pool for two years. Over the course of 10 years, judging by his behavior, it was clear that Hugo did not adjust to his life in captivity. Hugo would regularly bang his head against the walls of the tank. On March 4, 1980, Hugo died of a brain aneurysm after a history of repeated self injury.

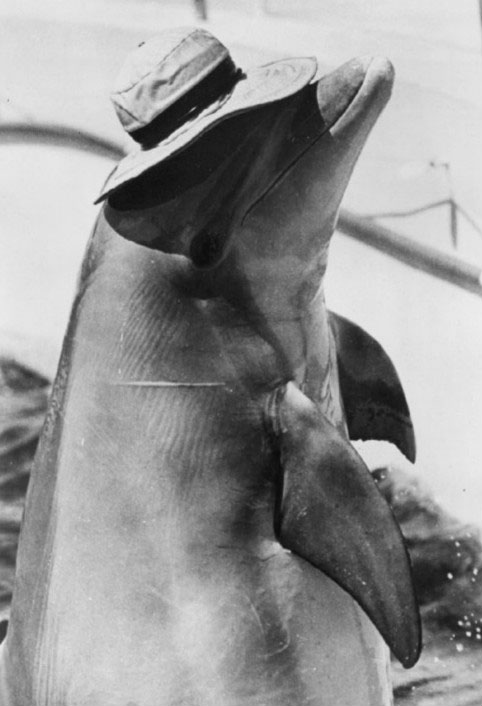
Dolphin named Bebe, one of the dolphins during the era of Flipper, at the Seaquarium in 1969

From 1963 through 1967, eighty-eight episodes of the 1960s TV show Flipper and two movies starring Flipper were filmed at the Miami Seaquarium. From 1963 to 1991, the Seaquarium also had the Miami Seaquarium Spacerail, which was the first hanging monorail in the United States.

In 2014 Miami Seaquarium was bought by Palace Entertainment.

In 2022, the Miami Seaquarium was acquired by The Dolphin Company, which said that any negligence in animal care preceded their arrival. A 2023 U.S. Department of Agriculture (USDA) Inspection Report found several violations of the Animal Welfare Act. The report cited inadequate veterinary care, animal handling, facilities, employees and/or attendants, and critical separation of animals. Miami-Dade County has the option to terminate the Seaquarium’s lease and has considered that option as they have ongoing concerns about care of animals. In December 2023, three manatees were relocated to ZooTampa and SeaWorld Orlando. In January 2024, the USDA was satisfied that the operators had addressed issues related to their notice of intent to confiscate to remove certain animals. The lease requirements mandate certifications from both Alliance of Marine Mammal Parks and Aquariums and American Humane. Local media reported in February 2024 that they had lost their accreditation from American Humane. The Dolphin Company was also behind on its rent payment according to the county’s parks department.

In March 2024, Miami-Dade County sent a lease termination notice to The Dolphin Company, giving the Seaquarium's owner until April 21 to vacate the premises. In the notice, Mayor Daniella Levine Cava cited a "long and troubling history of violations." As of June 25, 2024, the Dolphin Company, operator of the Seaquarium, was fighting the eviction.

On March 31, 2025, The Dolphin Company filed for Chapter 11 bankruptcy protection to deal with its debt and financial challenges. On September 16, 2025, Bimimi, a 26-year old dolphin, died from what The Dolphin Company stated was chronic illness. Her mother, Nosey, had performed as the Miami Dolphins's mascot, Snowflake, in the 1994 Jim Carrey film Ace Ventura: Pet Detective.

On September 26, 2025, Miami Dade County and the Dolphin Company announced an agreement that would lease the Miami Seaquarium site to the South Florida development firm, Terra Group. Terra Group outlined its intentions to close the facility permanently in favor of an marina and a new aquarium without marine mammals and with modern zoological accreditation. The facility closed its doors over the weekend of October 11, 2025.

== Lolita the Orca ==
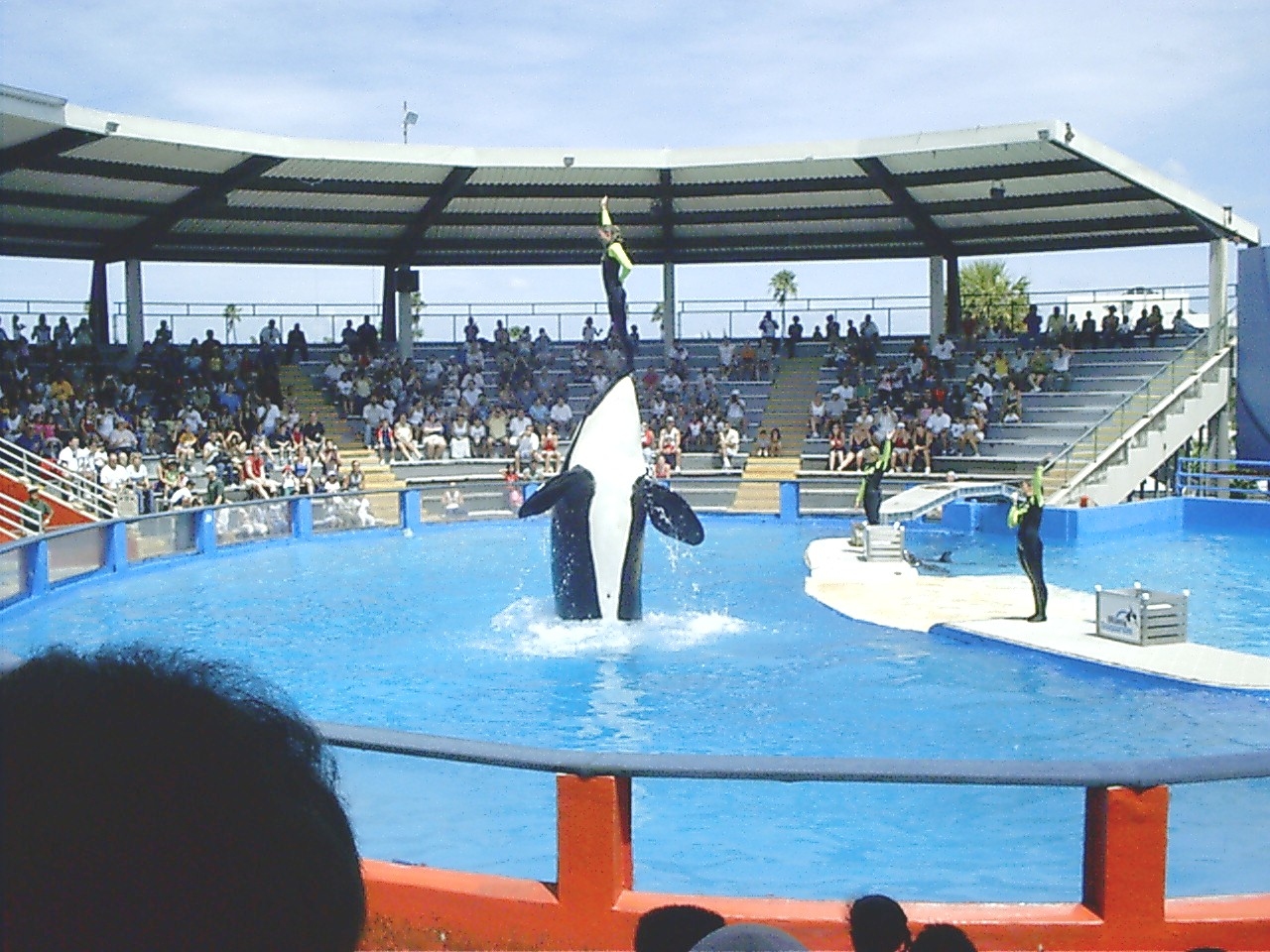
The orca show at Miami Seaquarium, starring Lolita, a 7,000-pound (3,200 kg) southern resident orca. The orca show was one of the Seaquarium's main attractions until 2021, when Lolita was taken off-display.

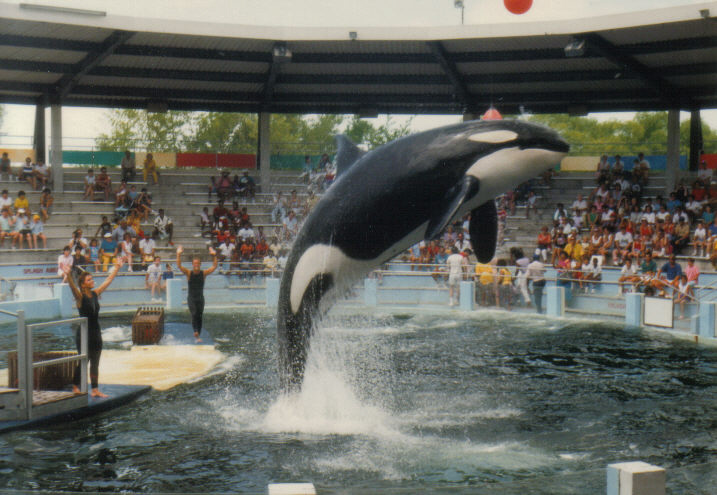
Lolita in 1998

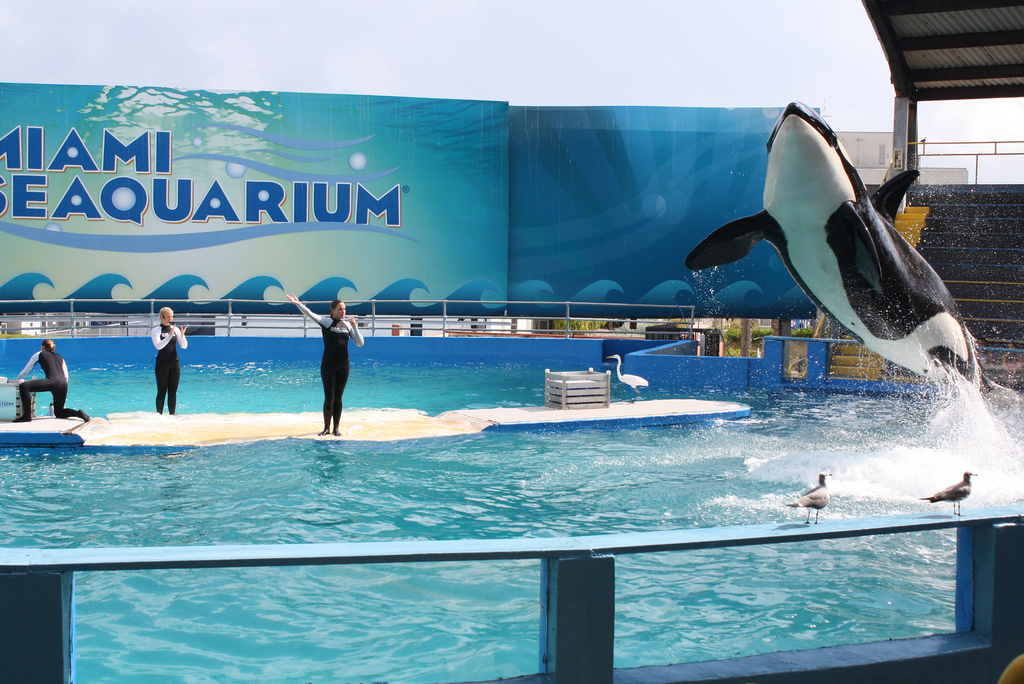
Lolita in 2011

One of the Miami Seaquarium's attractions was Lolita, who, at the time of her death in 2023, was the second oldest orca in captivity after Corky at SeaWorld San Diego. She was the park's last captive orca. Lolita was captured on August 8, 1970, during the Penn Cove capture in Puget Sound, Washington state. She arrived at the Miami Seaquarium on September 24, 1970, where she joined the park's first orca, Hugo. Hugo died in 1980 after injuring himself along the walls of the tank. Animal rights activists argued that the tank did not meet federal minimum requirements under the Animal Welfare Act, and the USDA made statements in 2017 supporting the activists' argument.

On January 24, 2014, the National Marine Fisheries Service proposed amending the Endangered Species Act to remove the exception that did not include Lolita as part of the ESA-listed Southern resident orcas that live in Washington and British Columbia waters. Activists, who proposed such an action to the NMFS in 2013, were hopeful that this might lead to a healthy retirement in a seapen and possibly an eventual release and reuniting with her pod which is believed by some to include her mother.

The Lummi Nation of Washington State referred to Lolita as Sk’aliCh’elh-tenaut, or a female orca from an ancestral site in the Penn Cove area of the Salish Sea bioregion. They viewed her as a member of their "qwe lhol mechen", which "translates to 'our relative under the water'", according to former Lummi tribal chairman Jay Julius. Lolita was viewed as a member of the Lummi Nation's family, and they believed that she should have been returned to the Salish Sea bioregion. The Lummi gathered at the Seaquarium numerous times to ask that Lolita be returned. In 2018, Seaquarium Curator Emeritus Robert Rose responded to Lummi protests, saying that the Lummi "should be ashamed of themselves, they don’t care about Lolita, they don’t care about her best interests, they don’t really care whether she lives or dies. To them, she is nothing more than a vehicle by which they promote their name, their political agenda, to obtain money and to gain media attention. Shame on them." In response, environmental scholars and Julius have argued that such statements are representative of a troubling pattern of discounting Native American knowledge and relationships which are "part and parcel of the possessive nature of settler colonialism."

The Miami Seaquarium announced on March 30, 2023, that Lolita was expected to be returned to her natal waters in the Pacific Northwest and reside in a semi-wild sea-pen in the Salish Sea for the remainder of her life. She would be joined in the relocation efforts by the park's companion pair of pacific white-sided dolphins: Li'i and Loke. Loke and her offspring Elelo were instead transferred to Shedd Aquarium in Chicago on August 3, 2023.

On August 18, 2023, the death of Lolita was announced, from what was believed to be a renal condition. On September 25, 2023, the Seaquarium announced that Li’i, the remaining 40-year-old, male Pacific white-sided dolphin that was expected to be moved with Lolita, was relocated to SeaWorld San Antonio and reunited with family members and other Pacific white-sided dolphins to avoid remaining in solitary following Lolita's death.

== Gallery ==
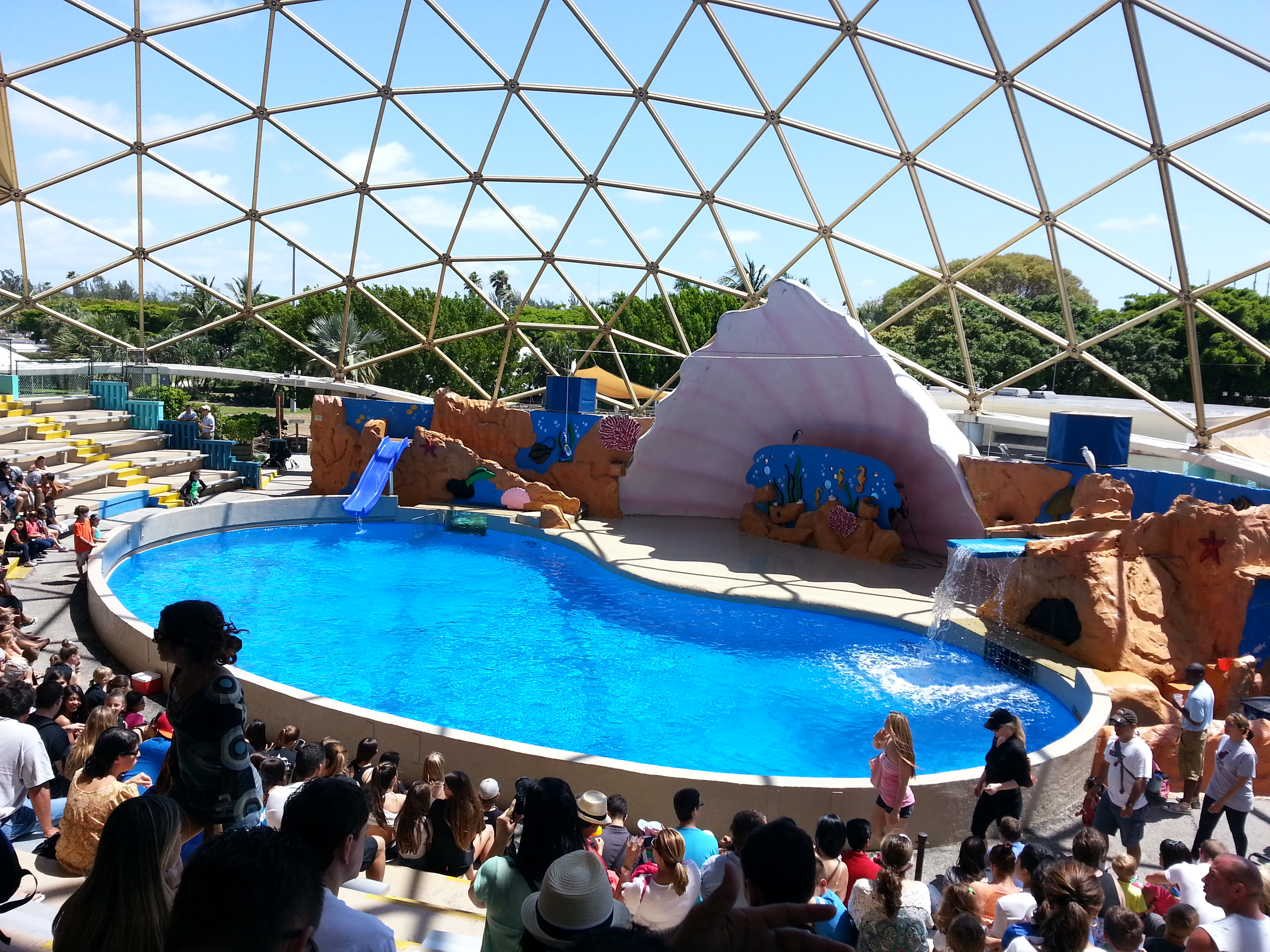
The Golden Dome

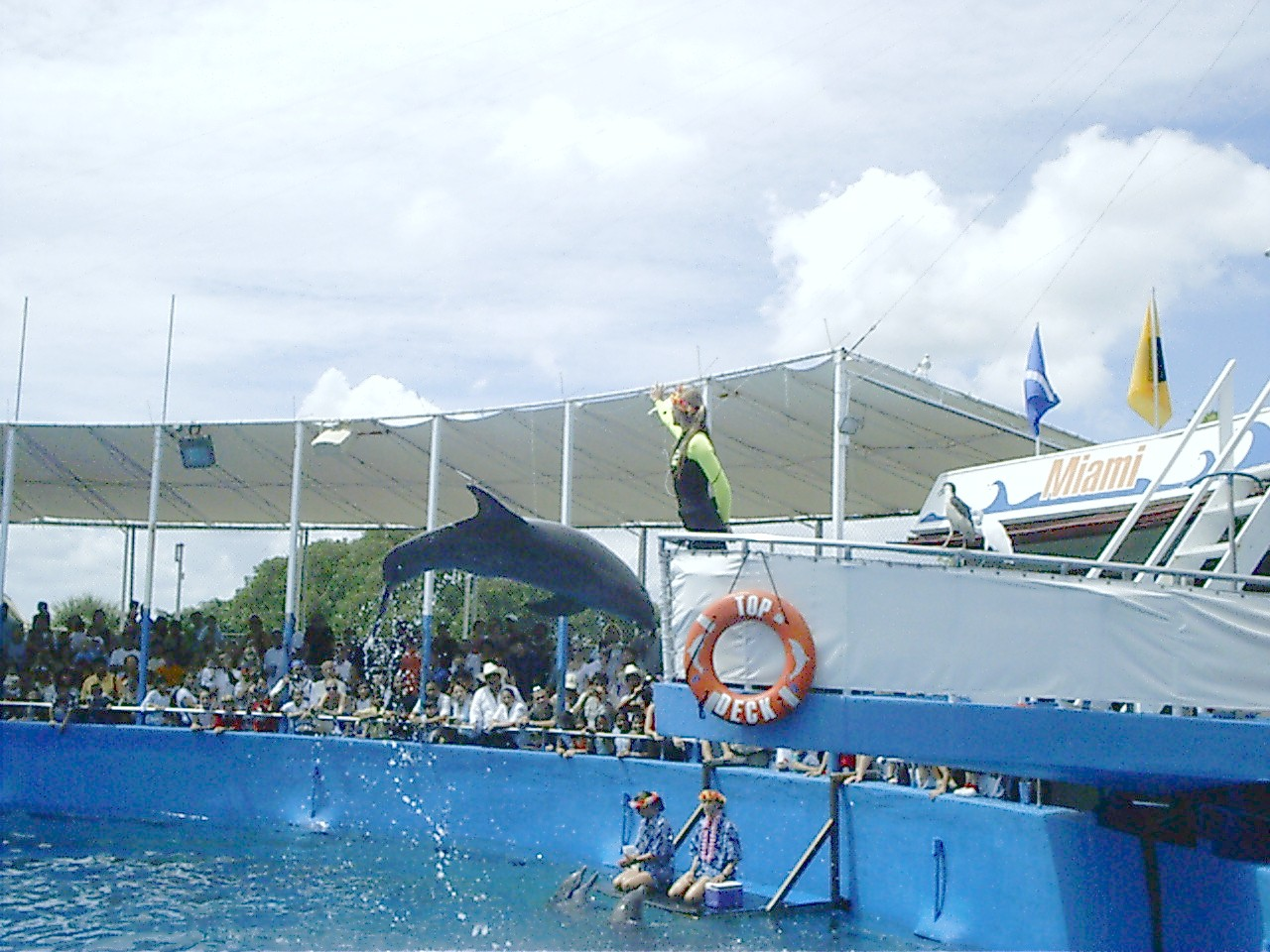
The Top Deck dolphin show at the Miami Seaquarium

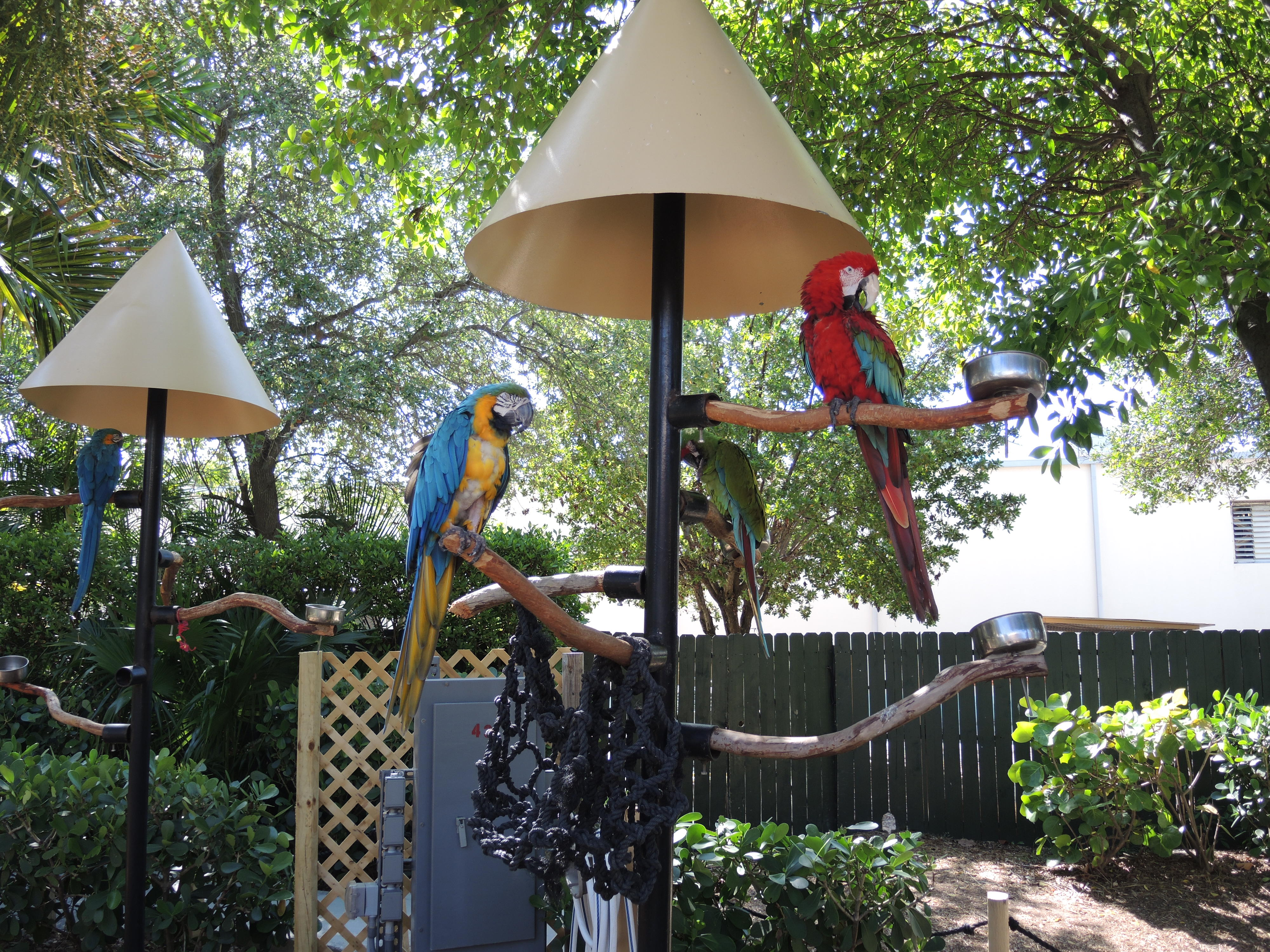
Parrots in the Tropical Wings exhibits

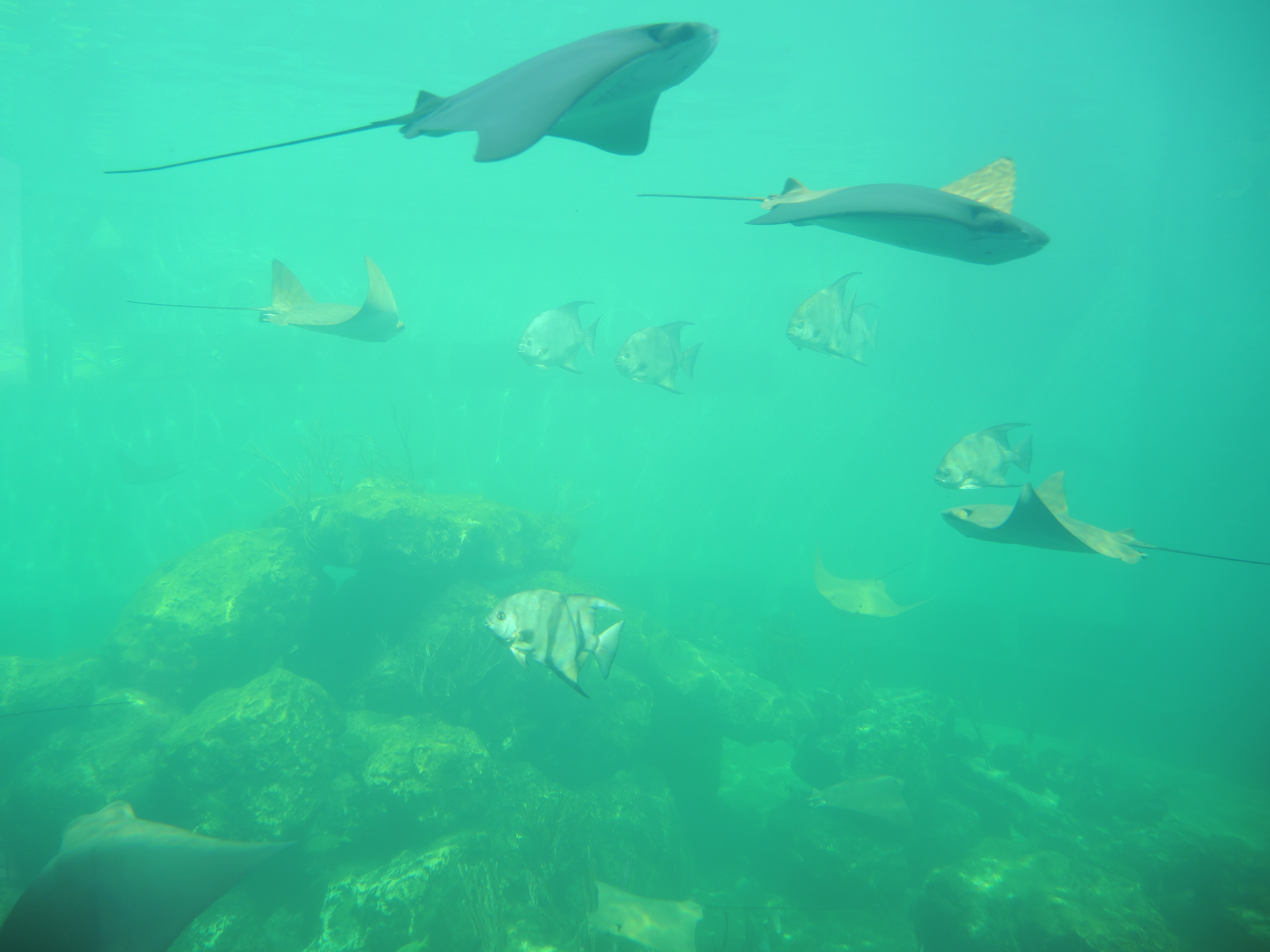

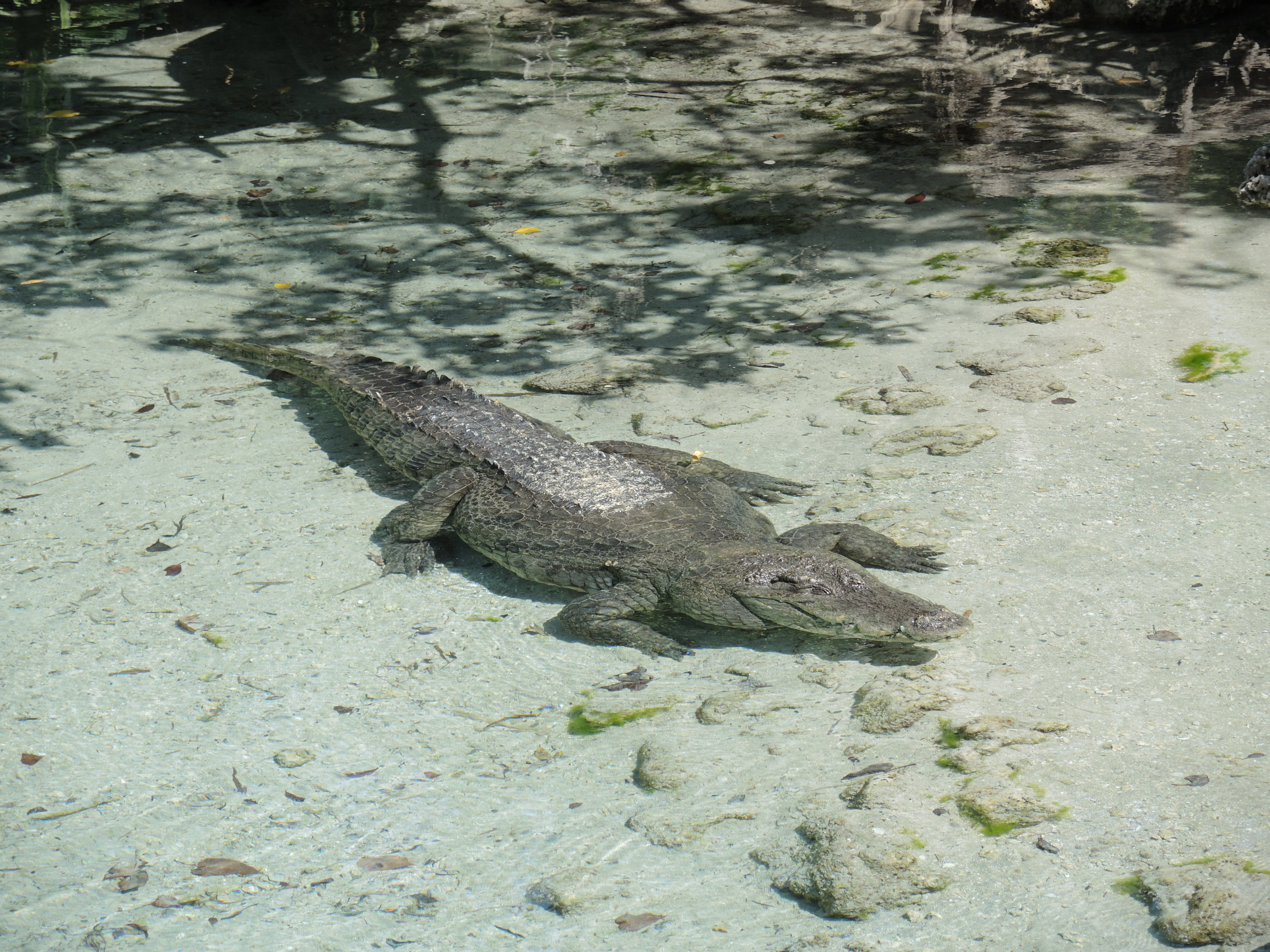
Crocodile

== See also ==
- List of captive orcas
- SeaWorld Orlando
