= R. Tom Gilleon =

American artist (born 1942)

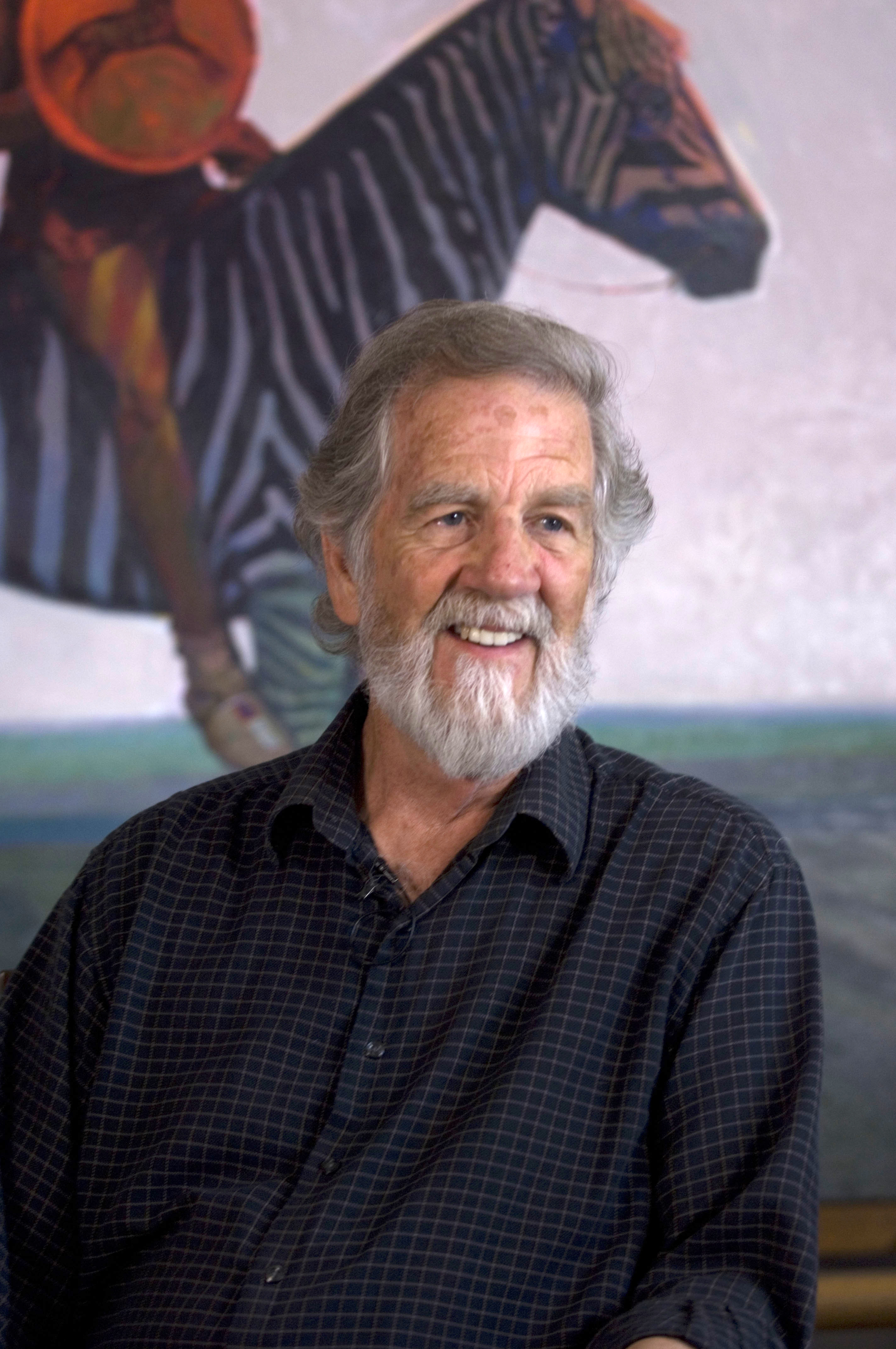
- Born: Ralph Thomas Gilleon; March 14, 1942; Gainesville, Florida, U.S.
- Known for: Painting
- Spouse: Laurie Stevens (m. 1986; div. 2019)
- Website: www.tomgilleon.art

Ralph Thomas Gilleon (born March 14, 1942) is an American artist who is best known for his paintings of Tipis, Plains Indians, and Old West imagery. His work is unusual within the Western art genre for its modernist style, taking inspiration from artists such as Andy Warhol, Mark Rothko, and Edward Hopper.

== Works ==
Gilleon's paintings can be found in the permanent collections of the C.M. Russell Museum, the Booth Western Art Museum, and Whitney Western Art Museum. His work is also included in large private collections such as the Tom Petrie collection, the Tim Peterson collection, the Erwin and Helga Haub collection, and the Patrick and Carol Hemingway collection.

== Awards, honors, and membership ==
- 2009: Named feature artist of the Jackson Hole Fall Arts Festival.
- 2012: Booth Western Art Museum hosted solo exhibit titled The Iconic West of R. Tom Gilleon. January 28 – May 27.
- 2013: Gilleon was the first living artist to have a solo exhibit at the C.M. Russell Museum. Titled Let Icons Be Icons: The Art of R. Tom Gilleon. August 16 – December 28.
- 2013: Gilleon's painting Hair Apparent broke the record sale price of any living artist at the Russell live auction when it sold for $225,000.
- 2024 (upcoming): Scottsdale's Museum of the West will host a retrospective with works by R. Tom Gilleon.
- Founding member of the C.M. Russell Skull Society of Artists.
- Member of the C.M. Russell Riders.
- Member of the Montana Painters Alliance.
