= List of people from St. Petersburg, Florida =

This is a list of notable past and present residents of the U.S. city of St. Petersburg, Florida, and its surrounding metropolitan area.

== Sports ==
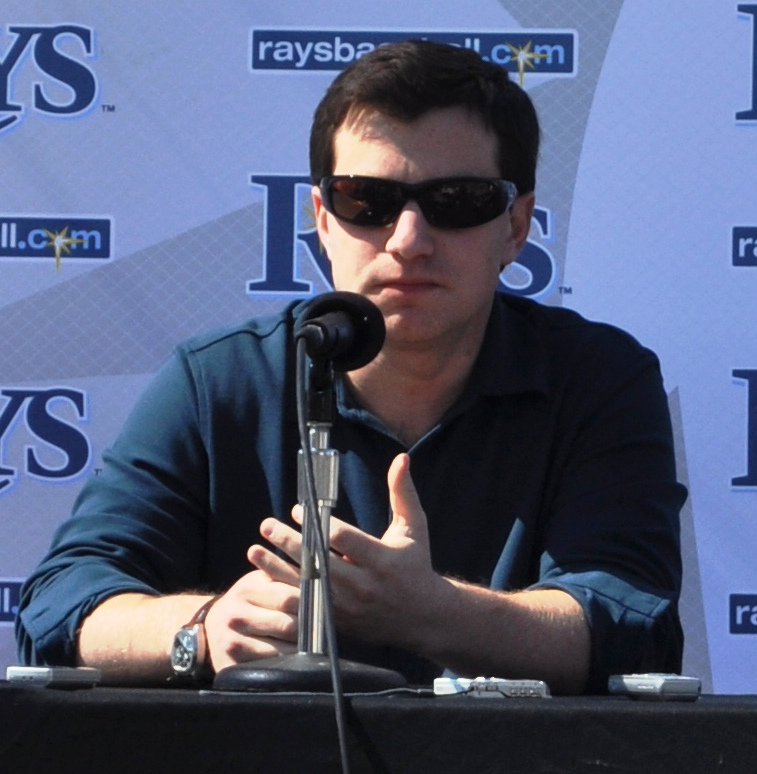
Andrew Friedman

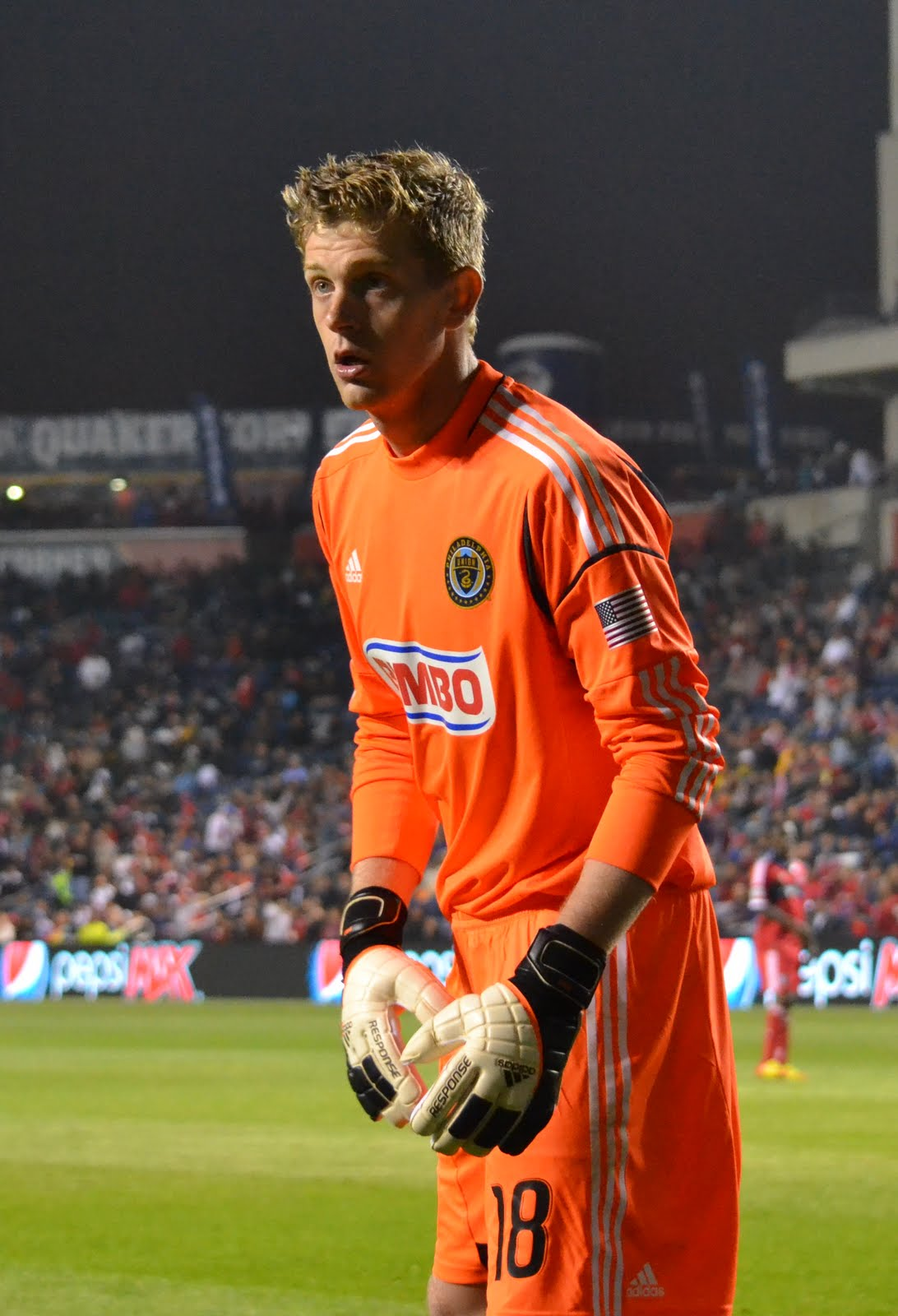
Zac MacMath

- Kurt Abbott (b. 1969), Major League Baseball (MLB) shortstop for the Oakland Athletics
- Rodney Adams (b. 1994), National Football League (NFL) player
- Jack Albright (1921–1991), MLB shortstop for the Philadelphia Phillies
- Mike Alstott (b. 1973), NFL football player for Tampa Bay Buccaneers
- Ricky Anderson (b. 1963), All-American football player
- Rolando Arrojo (b. 1965), MLB pitcher; one of first free agents signed by Tampa Bay Devil Rays
- Lynn Barry (b. 1959), basketball player with Women's National Basketball Association
- Bo Bichette (b. 1998), Major League Baseball player
- Chaim Bloom (b. 1983), senior vice president of Baseball Operations for the Tampa Bay Rays
- Murle Breer (b. 1939), professional golfer, U.S. Women's Open champion
- Sebastien Bourdais (b. 1979), French professional racing driver
- Joe Buck (b. 1969), Fox Sports announcer
- Chad Burt (b. 1988), soccer player and coach
- Danielle Collins (b. 1993), professional tennis player
- Jeff D'Amico (b. 1975), MLB pitcher
- Andrew Friedman (b. 1976), MLB general manager
- Ernest Givins (b. 1964), NFL football player
- Dwight Gooden (b. 1964), MLB pitcher 1984–2000, 4-time All-Star
- Colton Gordon (b. 1998), MLB pitcher for Milwaukee Brewers
- Shaquill Griffin (b. 1995), NFL player
- Shaquem Griffin (b. 1995), NFL player
- Nicole Haislett (b. 1972), Olympic gold medalist in swimming
- Jack Hardy (b. 1959), MLB pitcher
- Barry Horowitz (b. 1959), amateur wrestler, professional wrestler
- Charles Horton (b.), football player* Nikita Johnson (b. 2008), racing driver
- Bobby Kline (1929–2021), MLB shortstop for Washington Senators
- Casey Kotchman (b. 1983), MLB first baseman
- Ben Kozlowski (b. 1980), MLB pitcher
- Jeff Lacy (b. 1977), professional boxer
- Max Lanier (1915–2007), MLB pitcher, St. Louis Cardinals
- Ron LeFlore (b. 1948), MLB outfielder, Detroit Tigers
- Gordon Mackenzie (1937–2014), MLB player, minor league manager
- Zac MacMath (b. 1991), goalkeeper in Major League Soccer
- Kevin Marion (b. 1984), former professional American and Canadian football player
- Kaylan Marckese (b. 1998), soccer player for Arsenal
- Nick Masset (b. 1982), MLB pitcher
- Mark Mendelblatt (b. 1973), yachtsman, silver medalist at 1999 Pan American Games and 2004 Laser World Championships
- Betsy Nagelsen (b. 1956), professional tennis player
- Johnny Nee (1890–1957), baseball scout
- Janet Newberry (b. 1953), professional tennis player, US team and Boston Lobsters
- Dan O'Brien (b. 1954), MLB pitcher for St. Louis Cardinals
- Nate Oliver (b. 1940), MLB second baseman
- Ron Plaza (1934–2012), MLB player and minor league manager
- George Smith (1937–1987), MLB second baseman
- Roy Smith (b. 1976), MLB pitcher
- Speedy Smith (b. 1993), American basketball player for Hapoel Jerusalem of the Israeli Basketball Premier League
- Marreese Speights (b. 1987), basketball player for NCAA champion Florida and NBA champion Golden State Warriors
- Pat Terrell (b. 1968), professional NFL player
- Doug Waechter (b. 1981), MLB pitcher
- Dan Wheldon (1978–2011), Indy Racing League driver (killed in 15-car crash on October 16, 2011)
- Frank Wren (b. 1958), MLB general manager
- Winky Wright (b. 1971), professional boxer
- Jerry Wunsch (b. 1974), professional football player
- Isaiah Wynn (b. 1995), professional NFL player
- Emilio Ycaza (b. 1997), soccer player

== Movies, television, other media ==
- Angela Bassett (b. 1958), actress
- Eugenie Bondurant, actress
- Megan Fox, actress and model
- Michael France (1962–2013), screenwriter
- Chris Fuller (b. 1982), filmmaker
- Kip Kedersha (b. 1957), creator of YouTube channel Kipkay, YouTuber, internet celebrity
- Bert Kreischer (b. 1972), stand-up comedian, podcaster, reality television host and actor
- Dennis Lehane (b. 1965), author
- Will Packer (b. 1974), film producer
- Justin Hires (b. 1985), actor
- Pearl (b.), drag queen, runner-up on RuPaul's Drag Race season 7
- Rhonda Shear (b. 1954), actress and entrepreneur
- Martin Sherman (b. 1971), actor
- Sean Waltman (b. 1972), professional wrestler, ring names "1–2–3 Kid" and "X-Pac"
- Patrick Wilson (b. 1973), actor

== Music, the arts ==
- Edel Alvarez Galban (b. 1967), painter
- David Budd (1927–1991), abstract painter
- Exene Cervenka (b. 1956), singer
- Al Downing (1916–2000), jazz musician, member of Tuskegee Airmen
- John King (1953–2009), ukulelist
- Todd La Torre (b. 1974), lead singer for progressive metal band Queensrÿche
- Michael Lynche (b. 1983), singer
- Mary Ellen Moylan (1925–2020), ballet dancer
- Iron Mike Norton (b. 1973), swamp stomp recording artist and slide guitarist
- Antonio Permuy, art patron, curator, art critic
- Babs Reingold (b.), interdisciplinary artist
- Rod Wave (b. 1998), rapper
- Jaromir Weinberger (1896–1967), composer

== Writers ==
- Charles B. Dew (b. 1937), historian
- Michele Elliott (b. 1946), author, psychologist and founder of child protection charity Kidscape
- Thomas French (b. 1958), journalist
- Bob Devin Jones, playwright, director
- Jack Kerouac (1922–1969), leading figure of the Beat Generation
- Terrence McNally (1938–2020), dramatist
- Elie Wiesel (1928–2016), Nobel laureate, writer, political activist, author of Night, about his experience in concentration camps in 1944–1945; taught at Eckerd College during the winter term
- Ernest Vincent Wright (1872–1939), author of Gadsby, a 50,000-word lipogram

== Politics ==
- Charlie Crist (b. 1956), former U.S. representative and governor of Florida
- Bill Heller (1935–2020), member of the Florida House of Representatives and dean of the University of South Florida St. Petersburg College of Education
- Zeola Hershey Misener (1878–1966), suffragist and one of the first women elected to the Indiana General Assembly
- Al Lang (1870–1960), businessman and politician credited with bringing baseball spring training to St. Petersburg; amesake of Al Lang Stadium
- Anna Paulina Luna (b. 1989), U.S. representative
- Anastase Andreivitch Vonsiatsky (1898–1965), Russian fascist leader in exile
- Omali Yeshitela (b. 1941), African internationalist, founder of the Uhuru Movement and chair of the African People's Socialist Party
- Bill Young (1930–2013), U.S. representative

== Miscellaneous ==
- Tony Ables (b. 1954), serial killer and robber
- Paul Bilzerian (b. 1950), financier convicted of securities fraud
- Peter Demens (1850–1919), Russian nobleman and businessman
- Jarvis Hunt (1863–1941), architect
- Joe S. Lawrie (1916–2009), U.S. Army major general
- Brett James McMullen (b. 1961), United States Air Force general officer
- Ray Robson (b. 1994), young chess master
- James A. Ryan (1867–1956), U.S. Army brigadier general
- Jimmy Wales (b. 1966), Wikipedia co-founder
- John Constantine Williams Sr. (d. 1892), businessman and co-founder of St. Petersburg
