= Miami Seaquarium Spacerail =

Hanging monorail at Miami Seaquarium

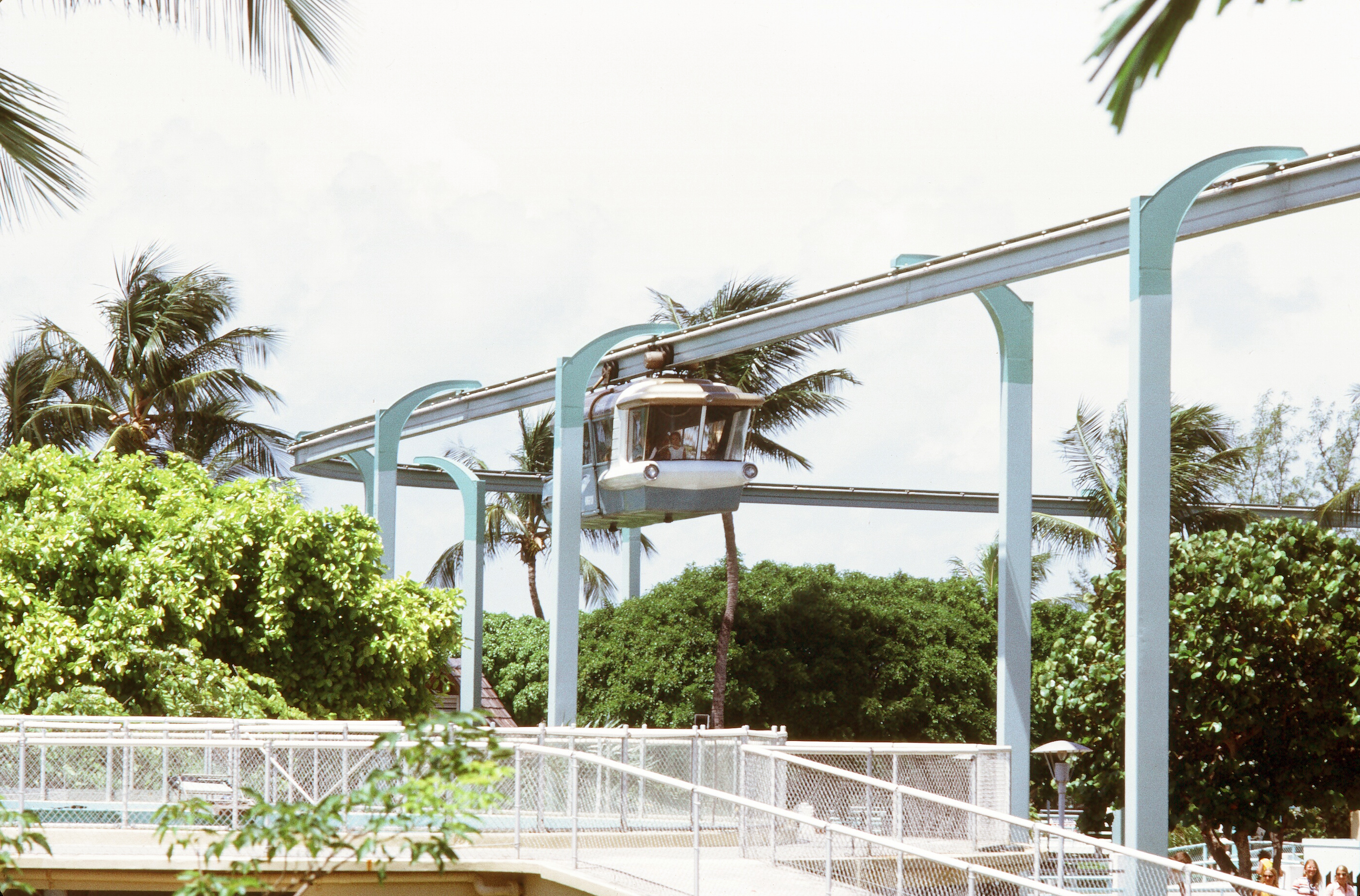

Overview
- Locale: Miami Seaquarium
- Transit type: monorail
- Number of lines: 1
- Number of stations: 1

Operation
- Began operation: 1963
- Ended operation: 1991
- Number of vehicles: 6

Technical
- System length: 0.45 mi (0.72 km)
- Average speed: 6 mph (9.7 km/h)

The Miami Seaquarium Spacerail was a monorail at Miami Seaquarium. It existed solely for entertainment, not transportation, as it had only one station. It offered views not only of the Seaquarium exhibits and buildings, but also of the Miami skyline. There were six cars, though only five were run at a time, and the cars had names after fish. The cars had unique styling until they were redesigned in 1978 to be rectangular and their names were removed. The cars operated around the loop counterclockwise, and had an Automatic Block Signal system.

In 1991, the Seaquarium was to be expanded. By that time, the monorail ridership was low, due to a loss of novelty. Furthermore, it was obsolete and labor-intensive. There was some consideration to turn the monorail into a parking lot, but in the end, the monorail was demolished, because the expanded park crowded out the views from the ride, although this may not have been an issue if the monorail had been built to operate in the opposite direction. The cars are now used as storage sheds, although there are some calls to preserve them.

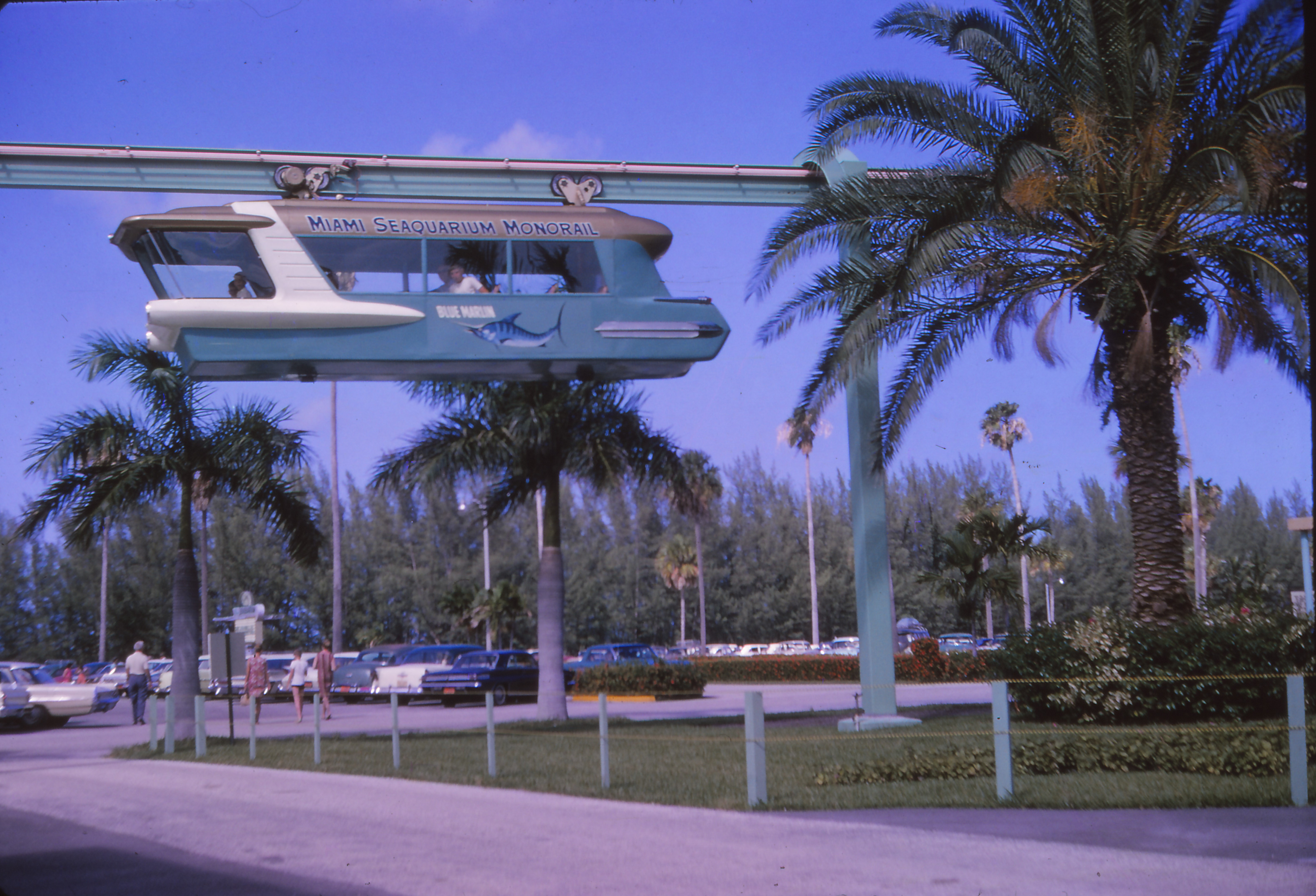
The Blue Marlin Spacerail Car, 1964
