= Booth Western Art Museum =

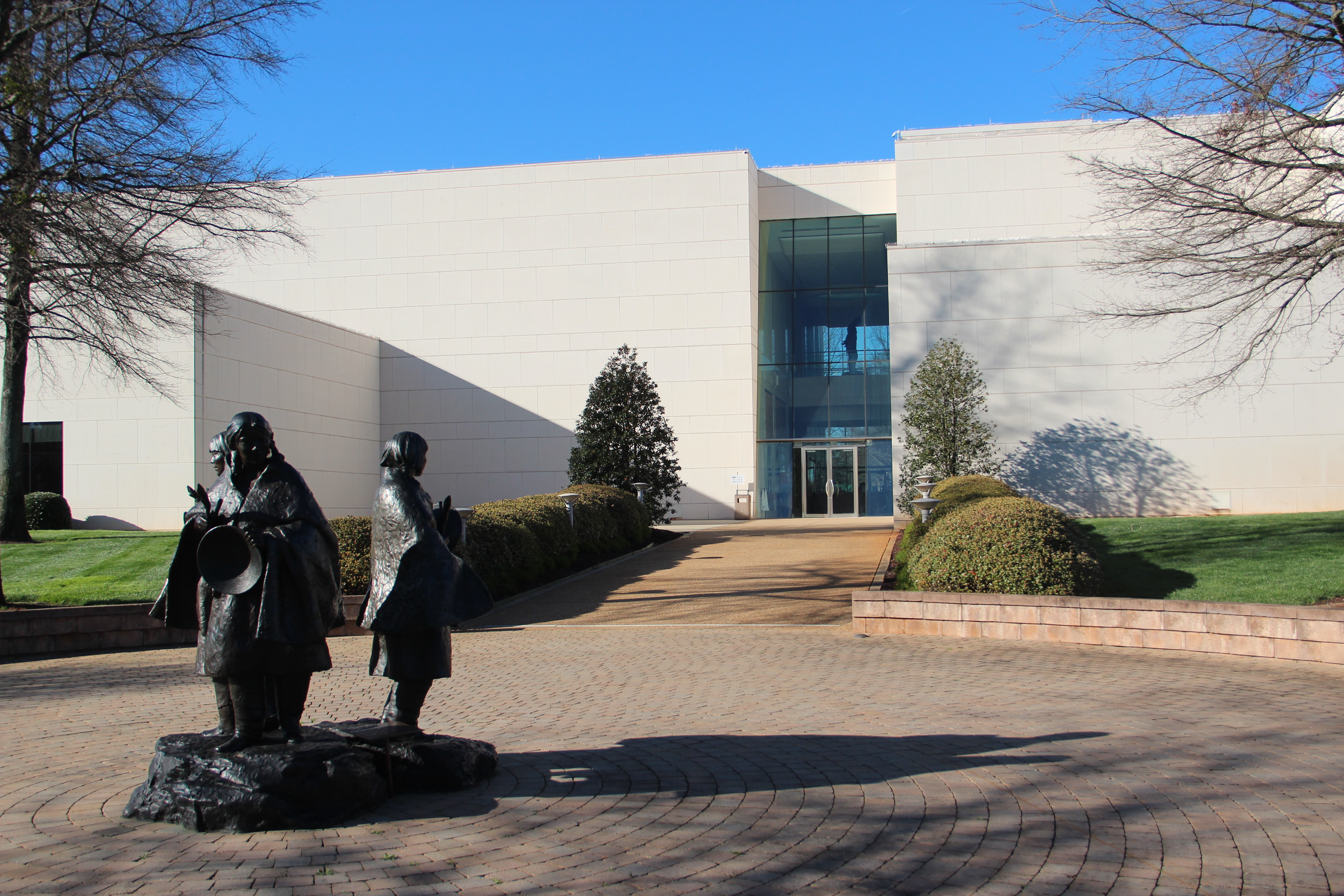
- Booth Western Art Museum
- Established: August 2003
- Location: Cartersville, Georgia
- Coordinates: 34.16819°N 84.79596°W
- Type: Art museum
- Executive director: Seth Hopkins
- Website: boothmuseum.org

Booth Western Art Museum, located in Cartersville, Georgia, is a museum dedicated to the Western United States. It is one of only two museums of its kind in the Southeastern United States, the other being the James Museum of Western and Wildlife Art in St. Petersburg, Florida. The Booth opened its doors in August 2003 with 80,000 square feet (7,400 m^{2}) of contemporary art, illustration, movie posters, Civil War art, Indigenous art and depiction, presidential portraits and letters, authentic stagecoaches, and an interactive hands-on gallery for children based on a working ranch.

A 40,000-square-foot (3,700 m^{2}) expansion, completed in October 2009, doubled the museum’s exhibition space, allowing for even more artwork to be displayed. Now at 120,000 square feet (11,000 m^{2}), Booth Museum is the second largest art museum in Georgia, and houses the largest permanent exhibition space for Western art in the country, with examples of early Western artists such as George Catlin, Albert Bierstadt, Frederic Remington, and Charles Russell. However, the core of the collection is built around living artists of traditional Western imagery such as Howard Terpning, Ken Riley, and G. Harvey, as well as more contemporary artists like Ed Mell, Thom Ross, Donna Howell-Sickles, and Kim Wiggins.

The museum also features an outdoor sculpture garden.

== Awards and affiliations ==
- Became a Smithsonian Institution Affiliate in August 2006
- Invited to and accepted the invitation to join the Museums West Consortium in January 2008
- Nominated for a National Medal for Museum and Library Service by Congressman Phil Gingrey (January 2008)
- Received an Honorable Mention at the Georgia Association of Museums and Galleries 2011 Annual Conference for the exhibit Ansel Adams: A Legacy
- Named Best Art Museum by USAToday Readers' Choice award program in 2020, 2021 and 2022
- 2016 Escape to the Southeast Travel Attraction of the Year by the Southeast Tourism Society
- 2016, 2021 and 2022 Reader’s Choice “Best Western Museum” in America by True West Magazine
