= Kipkay =

American YouTuber (born 1957)

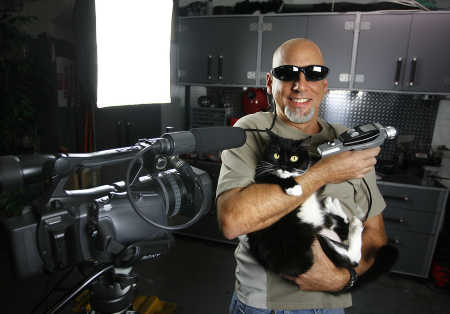
- Kipkay in his garage with his former cat, Tux in 2009
- Born: Kip Kedersha; December 12, 1957 (age 68); Short Hills, New Jersey, U.S.

YouTube information
- Channel: kipkay
- Subscribers: 2.47 million
- Views: 720 million
- Last updated: Sep 3, 2026
- Website: KipKay.com

Kip Kedersha (born December 12, 1957), better known as Kipkay, is an American author of how-to videos. As of 2008, Kedersha was the all-time top-grossing Metacafe user, having earned more than $120,000 for his series of instructional videos. The series broadcast on the internet and premiered on August 12, 2007. More than 150 episodes were made and the show can be found on distribution channels including YouTube and formerly Blip. Kipkay's videos can be grouped into categories of pranks, DIY, how-to, social experiments, and hacks. Kipkay has not been very active since around 2017.

== Life and career ==
Kipkay had no scientific background outside of standard college science classes. When he was 15 years old, his mother called him to come inside because it was raining. He tried to run away, but she gave chase and caught up with him. Once she got him inside, she forced him to read books on electronics as punishment. In an interview, Kipkay stated “I've always enjoyed tinkering with things," "and I learned a lot from my father, who taught me about mechanics and electronics. I'm just resourceful, I guess." Kipkay's video production career began with vocational TV production and broadcasting classes that led to a job in radio. Kip worked as a computer technician and part-time media director for his local church. Kip also worked for Make magazine who hired him to shoot and produce its Weekend Project series.

== History ==
Kipkay posts how-to videos demonstrating how people might re-engineer common household items, such as a flashlight or sunglasses, to show how they might acquire more power or usefulness. Kipkay had his own show on Youtoo TV which is a channel offered by Road Runner Cable. As of March 2024, his YouTube videos combined have reached over 718,000,000 views, with over 2.4 million subscribers.

He was interviewed on WJR Radio in 2008, and was heard on the show Videomaker. Kip appeared on the DIY Network TV show Garage Mahal and the Home Theatre Garage. His videos have been featured on the TV show Brink.
