= Thomas James (businessman) =

American businessman

- Born: 1942 or 1943 (age 83–84)
- Education: Harvard University; Harvard Business School; Stetson University
- Occupation: businessman
- Known for: chairman of Raymond James Financial for 30 years
- Spouse: Mary James
- Children: 2
- Parent: Robert James

Thomas James (born 1942 – 1943) is an American billionaire businessman, the chairman of Raymond James Financial, founded by his father Robert James, for 40 years. As of March 2022, his net worth was estimated at US$2.3 billion.

== Early life ==
James has a bachelor's degree from Harvard University, an MBA from Harvard Business School, and a JD degree from Stetson University.

== Career ==
James was made a board member of Raymond James Financial at the age of 20, and became CEO of the company in 1969 when he was 27 years old.

In 2010, James stepped down as CEO. James served as chairman of the board until February 2017, when he became chairman emeritus.

== Personal life ==
James is married, with two children, and lives in St. Petersburg, Florida.

== Philanthropy ==
In 2012, James and his wife, Mary, became benefactors of the James Center for Molecular and Life Sciences at Eckerd College.

James and Mary have a 2,500-piece art collection, mostly connected to the American West including artists such as Howard Terpning, known for his oil portraits of Native Americans. The James Museum of Western and Wildlife Art, an 80,000 sq ft two level facility, opened in downtown St Petersburg in August 2018.
