= James Museum of Western and Wildlife Art =

Coordinates: 27.7708°N 82.6347°W

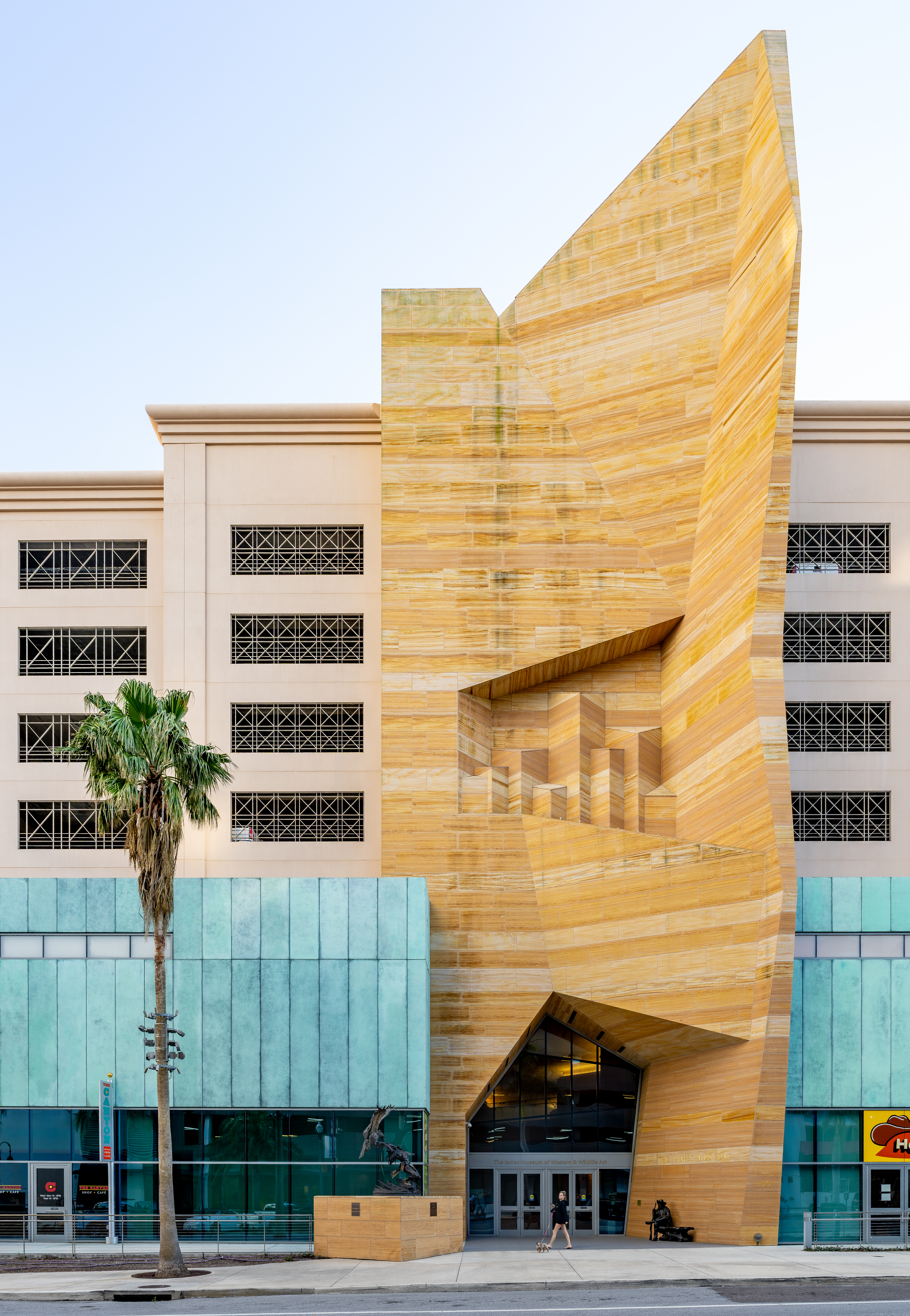
Main Entrance (2025)

The James Museum of Western & Wildlife Art is a museum located in St. Petersburg, Florida. The museum was founded by businessman Thomas James, and opened in 2018. The museum has thousands of pieces from the James' collection, including both contemporary and traditional works. Tom and Mary James spent $75 million creating the Museum.
The building uses veined sandstone to mimic the look of American Southwestern canyons, with carvings reminiscent of Mese Verde cliff dwellings. Weathered copper and turquoise panels evoke images of the Native American turquoise jewelry that is on display within the museum.

== Collection ==
The James Museum hosts a collection of sculptures, paintings, jewelry, and other artifacts primarily by artists from the 20th and 21st centuries. This collection is divided amongst eight distinct galleries: Introductory, Early West, Native Life, Native Artists, the Jewel Box, Frontier, Wildlife, and New West.
The Introductory Gallery includes a short video about the museum’s founding, the collection, and some of the artists whose work is featured. The gallery also included works that reveal parts of the history of the American West. Several bronze statues were made based on nineteenth century portraits of Native American leaders of the time, with plaques including information on the people and how the portraits were made. There are paintings of the landscapes in the West, for which the informational plaques include information about the westward expansion in the nineteenth century. The Early West Gallery contains artwork from when artists were just beginning to head westward, making the works, including several photogravures, some of the oldest in the collection. The Native Life Gallery contains works depicting Native American life from when settlers began heading West. While some of the artists featured in the gallery formed friendships within indigenous groups out West and painted scenes based on what they learned through those friendships, most of the featured artists “are not of Native heritage, but they incorporate historical research for accuracy and sensitivity in their interpretations of these diverse peoples." This gallery not only contains paintings and sculptures, but also some baskets and clothing. The Native Artists Gallery hosts pieces solely by contemporary Native American artists, and includes sculptures, jewelry, and paintings in a variety of styles. This gallery not only supports living artists, but also gives those artists a chance to share their work, culture, and history on their own terms. The Jewel Box contains jewelry primarily made of turquoise, and has information on the different types of turquoise and which mines they come from. The Frontier Gallery features several works by Chinese-American artists, depicting life as it was for Chinese-Americans during that time in history.

== Programs ==
The James Museum hosts various programs for families where they can take a kid-friendly tour of the museum before going to a studio within the museum to make art based on a particular theme or medium. For adults, the museum hosts artist talks, workshops, book clubs, and movie screenings, some of which are in person and some virtual. They also host school tours and summer art camps.
