= List of people from Pensacola, Florida =

This list of people from Pensacola, Florida includes people who were born or lived there for a nontrivial amount of time. Note that Pensacola natives are referred to as Pensacolans/Pensacolians.

== Politics, law, and military ==
- Reubin O'Donovan Askew - politician; 37th governor of Florida, 1971–1979
- Alexander Butterfield - deputy assistant to President Richard Nixon, 1969–1973
- Derrill M. Daniel - US Army major general
- Samuel Gibbs French (1818–1910) - military officer
- Harry B. Harris Jr. - diplomat and former U.S. Navy officer
- Daniel "Chappie" James Jr. - first African American to reach the rank of four-star general in the United States Armed Forces
- Fred Levin - lawyer
- Stephen Mallory (1812–1873) - politician
- Carol McCain - director of the White House Visitors Office during the Reagan administration
- Lori Otter - First Lady of Idaho (2007–2019)
- Charles H. Percy
- Joe Scarborough
- George O. Van Orden
- Craig Waters
- Ginger Wetherell
- Vince Whibbs
- Charles R. Wilson
- Emmett Wilson

== Religion ==
- Paula Ackerman
- Chuck Baldwin
- Paul Jennings Hill
- Martin Holley
- Kent Hovind
- Peter Ruckman
- Katharine Jefferts Schori

== Sports ==
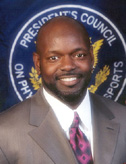
Emmitt Smith

- Jon Akin - soccer player
- Doug Baldwin
- Jay Bell
- Derrick Brooks
- Bryce Callahan
- Adron Chambers
- Tom Cheek
- Josh Donaldson
- Joe Durant
- Dave Elder
- Martin Emerson
- Reggie Evans
- Trinity Fatu
- Cortland Finnegan
- Travis Fryman
- Derrick Gainer
- Graham Gano
- Justin Gatlin
- Nick Green
- Tyronne Green
- Michael Hayes
- Kim Helton
- Horace Jones
- Roy Jones Jr.
- Alec Kessler
- Jonathan Little
- Johanna Long
- Max Macon
- Jason McKie
- Alfred Morris
- Winchester Osgood
- Jerry Pate
- Loucheiz Purifoy
- Damarious Randall
- Jeremy Reaves
- Roman Reigns
- Trent Richardson
- Rikishi
- Fred Robbins
- Mitchell Robinson
- Shorty Rollins
- Addison Russell
- Darrell Russell
- Kevin Saucier
- Buck Showalter
- Josh Sitton
- Heath Slocum
- Emmitt Smith
- Michelle Snow
- Ron Stallworth
- Omar Stoutmire
- Don Sutton
- Lawrence Tynes
- Mark Whiten
- Devon Witherspoon

== Music, media, and art ==
- Christopher Andersen
- Alfons Bach
- Ashley Brown
- Larry Butler
- Austin Carlile
- Joe Dallesandro
- Nancy Dussault
- Michael Edwards
- Mark Gormley
- Robert Graysmith
- Gigi Gryce - jazz composer and musician
- Bill Kurtis
- Bambi Linn
- Matt Maiellaro
- Rob and Amber Mariano
- Gwen McCrae
- Mike McCready
- Georgie A. Hulse McLeod
- Katy Mixon - actress and model
- Joshua Moon
- Dot Moore
- Joan Perry
- Bob Rasmussen
- John Schwab
- Peggy Scott-Adams
- Don Shirley - jazz and classical pianist, subject of the 2018 film Green Book
- This Bike Is a Pipe Bomb
- Peter Thomas - narrator known for Forensic Files
- Aaron Tippin

== Other ==
- John David Roy Atchison (1954–2007) - assistant US attorney and children's sports coach, committed suicide in prison after being charged with soliciting sex from a 5-year-old girl
- James Edward Wood (1947–2004) - child murderer and suspected serial killer
