= Kevin Marion =

American gridiron football player (born 1984)

No. 14
- Position: Wide receiver

Personal information
- Born: July 24, 1984 (age 42); St. Petersburg, Florida, U.S.
- Listed height: 5 ft 10 in (1.78 m)
- Listed weight: 180 lb (82 kg)

Career information
- College: Wake Forest University
- NFL draft: 2008: undrafted

Career history
- 2008: Pittsburgh Steelers*
- 2008: Buffalo Bills*
- 2009–2010: Montreal Alouettes*
- 2010: Harrisburg Stampede
- * Offseason or practice squad member only
- Stats at CFL.ca

Kevin Marion (born July 24, 1984) is an American former professional football wide receiver. He was signed by the Pittsburgh Steelers as an undrafted free agent in 2008. He played college football for the Wake Forest Demon Deacons.

During his football career at Wake Forest, Marion caught 44 passes for 485 yards and one touchdown. As a senior in 2007, he made 18 catches for 192 yards.

Marion was also a member of the Buffalo Bills, Montreal Alouettes, and Harrisburg Stampede.
