= Robert James (businessman) =

American businessman

Robert A. James (1909–1983) was an American businessman, the founder of Raymond James Financial, an S&P 500-listed financial services company.

== Career ==
James founded Raymond James Financial in St. Petersburg, Florida in 1962, as Robert A. James Investments. In 1964, Raymond and Associates merged into Robert A. James Investments to form Raymond James & Associates. In 1970, he stepped down as CEO, and his son, Thomas James took over.

== Death ==
James died in 1983.
