= Raymond James Financial =

American multinational independent investment bank and financial services company

Raymond James Financial, Inc.

- Headquarters in St. Petersburg, Florida
- Type: Public
- Traded as: NYSE: RJF; S&P 500 component
- Industry: Investment services
- Founded: 1962; 64 years ago
- Founder: Robert James
- Headquarters: St. Petersburg, Florida, U.S.
- Key people: Tom James (chairman emeritus); Paul Reilly (chairman and CEO); Paul Shoukry (president)
- Services: Retail banking, commercial banking, insurance, investment banking, mortgage loans, private banking, private equity, wealth management, credit cards, financial analysis
- Revenue: ▲US$15.9 billion (2025)
- Operating income: ▲US$2.71 billion (2025)
- Net income: ▲US$2.13 billion (2025)
- Total assets: ▲US$88.2 billion(2025)
- Total equity: ▲US$12.4 billion(2025)
- Number of employees: c. 19,500 (2025)
- Website: raymondjames.com
- Footnotes; Financials as of September 30, 2025.

Raymond James Financial, Inc. is an American multinational independent investment bank and financial services company providing financial services to individuals, corporations, and municipalities through its subsidiary companies that engage primarily in investment and financial planning, in addition to investment banking and asset management. The company is headquartered in St. Petersburg, Florida.

== History ==
Raymond James was founded in 1962 when St. Petersburg broker, Robert James, formed Robert A. James Investments. In 1964, it merged with Raymond & Associates, founded by Edward Raymond in 1963, to form Raymond James & Associates. Robert James' son, Tom James, joined in 1966 and assumed leadership of the firm in 1970. The firm planned to go public in 1969, but market conditions delayed its plan until 1983. Tom turned over the CEO's post to Paul Reilly in 2010, and his title as Chairman of the Board to Paul Reilly in 2016. He remains on the leadership team as Chairman Emeritus.

In 2012, the firm purchased the Canadian assets of Allied Irish Bank. In April 2012, they merged with Morgan Keegan & Company, creating one of the country's largest full-service wealth management and investment banking firms not headquartered in New York.

As of the fiscal quarter ending September 30, 2022, the firm had delivered 139 consecutive quarters of profitability. In June 2016, it was listed as a Fortune 500 company for the first time.

In September 2016, the firm announced its acquisition of Deutsche Bank Wealth Management's US private client services unit, Alex Brown & Sons.

In April 2017, the firm purchased Reams Asset Management from UMB Financial Corporation. The purchase, which amounted to $172.5 million, included Scouts Investments.

As of September 30, 2022, Raymond James has approximately 8,700 financial advisors throughout the United States, Canada and overseas. Total client assets under management are approximately $1.09 trillion.

In January 2026, it was announced Raymond James had agreed to acquire Clark Capital Management Group, a Philadelphia-based asset management firm with more than $46 billion in assets under management. The transaction, expected to be finalised by the third quarter of 2026 subject to regulatory approval, will see Clark Capital continue to operate under its own name as an independent boutique within Raymond James Investment Management, retaining its existing leadership, investment approach, and service model.

=== Current operations ===
Raymond James has four main lines of operation: private client group, capital markets (made up of equity and fixed income capital markets as well as public finance), asset management group (made up of asset management services and Carillon tower advisers) and banking.

== Controversies ==
=== SEC v. Dennis Herula ===
In 2004, the SEC fined Raymond James Financial Services, Inc. $6.9 million for failure to supervise former broker Dennis Herula. Herula was accused of participating with others in a Ponzi scheme that raised about $44.5 million from investors in 1999-2000. Herula himself raised about $16.5 million of investor funds, most of which was later transferred to his wife's brokerage account at Raymond James. He was arrested in Bermuda and pleaded guilty to criminal charges of wire fraud and sentenced to 188 months (15-2/3 years) in prison.

=== Supervision of branch managers ===
In 2005, the National Association of Securities Dealers fined Raymond James $2.75 million for lax supervision of producing branch managers. The investigation began with one Raymond James manager, who worked from an office in her Wisconsin home, handling approximately 700 accounts and selling mainly mutual funds and variable annuities. The Wisconsin manager was accused of selling unsuitable aggressive mutual funds and variable annuities over a four-year period.

=== Auction rate securities ===
On June 29, 2011, Raymond James announced an agreement to repurchase at par auction rate securities (ARS) sold to clients through its domestic broker/dealer subsidiaries prior to February 13, 2008. The agreement—reached with the Securities and Exchange Commission and with state securities regulators led by Florida and Texas—resolved more than three years of investigation related to activity in the ARS market. Without admitting or denying the allegations, the firm also agreed to pay a fine totaling $1.75 million to the state regulators, but was not fined by the SEC. Raymond James sold $2.3 billion worth of ARS, underwrote $1.2 billion, and was the auction dealer for over $725 million. Since the $330 billion market for ARS crashed in 2008, at least 19 underwriters and broker-dealers were sued in class action suits.

=== Notable FINRA Fines ===
In September 2011, the Financial Industry Regulatory Authority ordered Raymond James & Associates, Inc. and Raymond James Financial Services, Inc. to pay restitution of $1.69 million to 15,500 of their clients for charging excessive commissions on more than 27,000 securities transactions. The trades were made in client accounts between 2006 and 2010.

FINRA also fined RJA $225,000 and RJFS $200,000. On May 18, 2016 Raymond James was fined a total of $17M for failing to establish and implement adequate AML procedures, which resulted in the firms' failure to properly prevent or detect, investigate, and report suspicious activity for several years. RJA's former AML Compliance Officer, Linda L. Busby, was also fined $25,000 and suspended for three months. On December 21, 2017 Raymond James was fined $2 million for failing to reasonably supervise email communications.

== See also ==
- Raymond James Stadium, a multi-purpose stadium mostly hosting sports in Tampa, Florida, is named after the company through a licensing deal.
