= Hugo Vihlen =

American sailor

- Born: November 13, 1931 (age 94); Florida
- Known for: Sailing single-handed across the Atlantic Ocean in two tiny sailboats.

Hugo Vihlen (born November 13, 1931) is a single-handed sailor who set world records by crossing the Atlantic Ocean in two tiny sailboats in 1968 and 1993.

== 1968 transatlantic crossing ==
On March 29, 1968, Vihlen departed Casablanca, Morocco, in his 5-foot, 11-inch (1.8 m) sailboat April Fool. Over the course of 84 days he sailed some 4,100 miles (6,600 km) before his progress was thwarted by winds and currents. Vihlen was able to approach to within 6 miles (9.7 km) of Miami on the night of June 20 but he was pushed back to sea by offshore winds and the currents of the Gulf Stream. The United States Coast Guard launched a search for the sailor on the morning of June 21 at the request of his parents. He was first spotted by a party aboard the First Edition, a boat owned by Fort Lauderdale publisher Ted Gore who gave Vihlen food and water. Gore offered to tow Vihlen to shore but the sailor refused. Vihlen and April Fool eventually were taken aboard the United States Coast Guard Cutter Cape Shoalwater and then Vihlen transferred to the fishing boat Sea Wolf where his son and wife were waiting for him. At the time of the voyage, Vihlen was a co-pilot for Delta Air Lines living in Homestead, Florida.

The voyage is described in Vihlen's book April Fool, or, How I Sailed from Casablanca to Florida in a Six-foot Boat.

== 1993 transatlantic crossing ==
In 1993, he chose to leave from the U.S. coast and headed for England, crossing the North Atlantic in a boat, named Father's Day, that was just 5 feet 6 inches (1.68 m) long. The story of this four-month journey is told in Vihlen's book The Stormy Voyage of Father's Day (written with the help of Joanne Kimberlin).

Father's Day was originally built at 5 feet 6 inches long. On Vihlen's first attempt out of St. John's, Newfoundland, he met his rival and newfound friend Tom McNally who was also pursuing the record of crossing the North Atlantic from West to East. Tom's boat the, Big C, was 1½ inches smaller than the Father's Day. The first attempt out of Cape Cod was thwarted by the U.S. Coast Guard. Vihlen decided to leave from Canada where the distance was shorter, the currents were closer and the U.S. Coast Guard was absent. But he failed on his second attempt due to light and variable winds. He went home and cut 2 inches off of his boat and later set out again from St. John's, Newfoundland sailing to Falmouth, England in a 5-foot 4 inch sailboat taking 115 days. This trip earned him the record for the shortest boat to have crossed the Atlantic; the record for the smallest vessel by volume is held by Hannes Lindemann who crossed the Atlantic in a folding kayak.
