= 2010 Tampa Bay Storm season =

Arena Football League team season

- Head coach: Tim Marcum
- Home stadium: St. Pete Times Forum

Results
- Record: 11–5
- Division place: 2nd AC South
- Playoffs: Won Divisional Playoffs (Talons) 68–38; Won Conference Championship (Predators) 63–62; Lost ArenaBowl XXIII (Shock) 57–69

The 2010 Tampa Bay Storm season was the 23rd season for the franchise in the Arena Football League. The team was coached by Tim Marcum and played their home games at the St. Pete Times Forum.

== Standings ==
South Division
Team	W	L	PCT	PF	PA	DIV	CON	Home	Away
z-Jacksonville Sharks	12	4	.750	893	806	4–2	8–2	7–1	5–3
x-Tampa Bay Storm	11	5	.687	926	812	3–3	8–4	6–2	5–3
x-Orlando Predators	8	8	.500	865	845	4–2	7–3	4–4	4–4
Alabama Vipers	7	9	0.437	812	860	1–5	7–9	5–3	2–6

z - Clinched division and conference's best record
x - Clinched playoff berth

== Regular season schedule ==
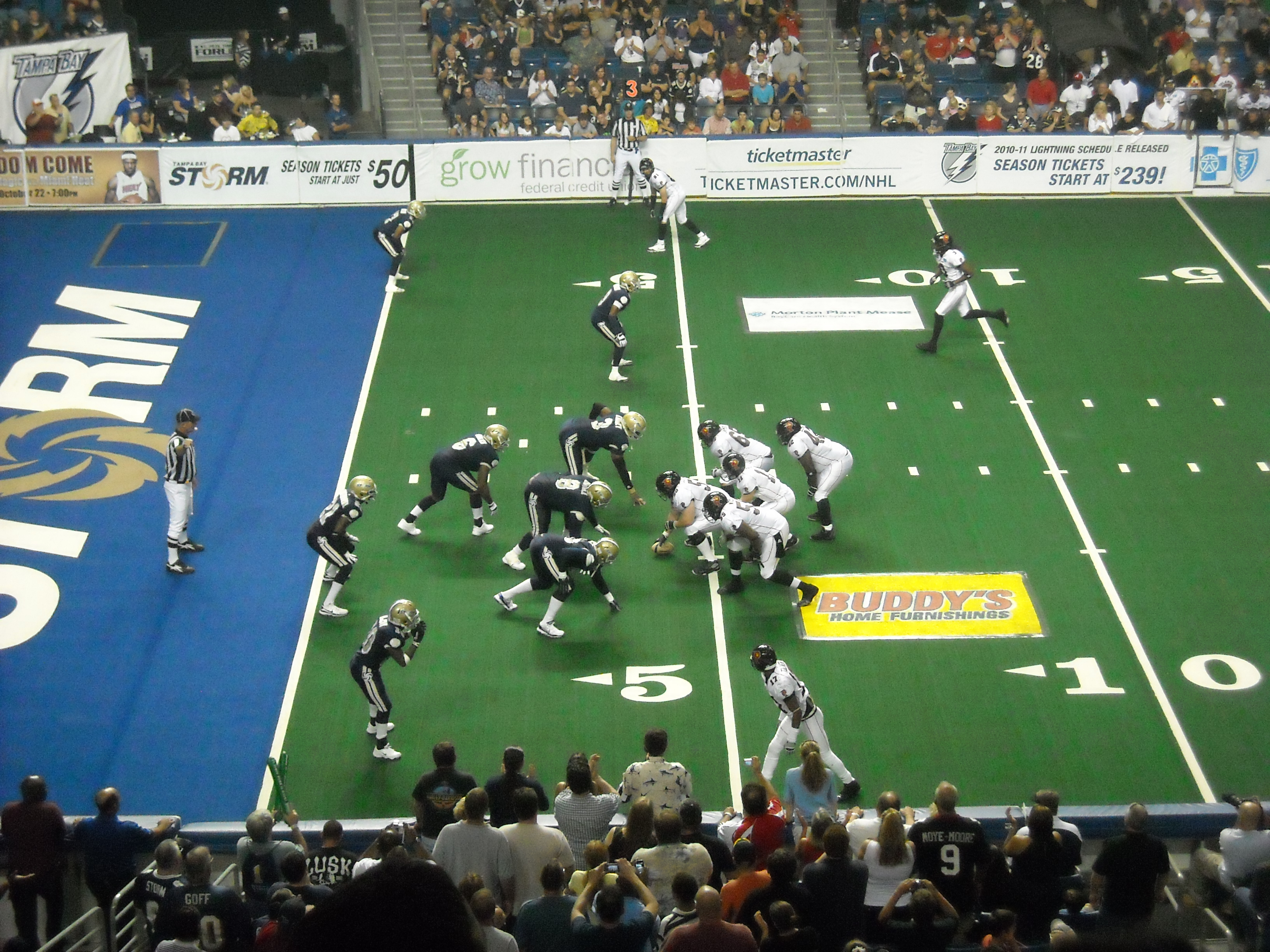
The Week 18 War on I-4 matchup against the Orlando Predators at the St. Pete Times Forum.

The Storm opened the season on the road against the Talons on April 3. Their first home game of the season was in Week 3 against the Vigilantes. The conclusion of the regular season was at the St. Pete Times Forum in Week 18 against the Predators in another edition of The War on I-4, on July 31.

Week	Day	Date	Kickoff	Opponent	Results		Location	Report
Week	Day	Date	Kickoff	Opponent	Score	Record	Location	Report
1	Saturday	April 3	8:00 pm	at Tulsa Talons	L 48–54	0–1	BOK Center	^{[usurped]}
2	Bye							
3	Friday	April 16	7:30 pm	Dallas Vigilantes	W 54–41	1–1	St. Pete Times Forum	^{[usurped]}
4	Sunday	April 25	5:00 pm	at Milwaukee Iron	L 61–72	1–2	Bradley Center	
5	Saturday	May 1	7:30 pm	Arizona Rattlers	W 62–61	2–2	St. Pete Times Forum	
6	Friday	May 7	8:00 pm	Jacksonville Sharks	L 43–46	2–3	St. Pete Times Forum	
7	Saturday	May 15	8:05 pm	at Bossier–Shreveport Battle Wings	W 48–44	3–3	CenturyTel Center	^{[usurped]}
8	Bye							
9	Friday	May 28	8:00 pm	at Orlando Predators	W 62–50	4–3	Amway Arena	
10	Saturday	June 5	7:30 pm	Oklahoma City Yard Dawgz	W 50–48	5–3	St. Pete Times Forum	
11	Saturday	June 12	8:30 pm	at Alabama Vipers	W 61–55	6–3	Von Braun Center	
12	Saturday	June 19	9:05 pm	at Utah Blaze	W 65–40	7–3	Maverik Center	^{[usurped]}
13	Friday	June 25	8:00 pm	Bossier–Shreveport Battle Wings	W 78–39	8–3	St. Pete Times Forum	
14	Friday	July 2	8:00 pm	Chicago Rush	W 68–60	9–3	St. Pete Times Forum	
15	Friday	July 9	8:00 pm	at Dallas Vigilantes	W 56–34	10–3	American Airlines Arena	
16	Saturday	July 17	7:05 pm	at Jacksonville Sharks	L 47–49	10–4	Jacksonville Veterans Memorial Arena	
17	Saturday	July 24	7:30 pm	Alabama Vipers	W 53–29	11–4	St. Pete Times Forum	
18	Saturday	July 31	7:30 pm	Orlando Predators	L 60–75	11–5	St. Pete Times Forum	

All times are EDT

== Playoff schedule ==
Round	Day	Date	Kickoff	Opponent	Score	Location	Report
AC Semifinals	Saturday	August 7	8:00 pm	at Tulsa Talons	W 68–38	BOK Center	
AC Championship	Saturday	August 14	7:30 pm	Orlando Predators	W 63–62	St. Pete Times Forum	
ArenaBowl XXIII	Friday	August 20	8:00 pm	at Spokane Shock	L 57–69	Spokane Veterans Memorial Arena	

All times are EDT

== Roster ==
2010 Tampa Bay Storm roster
Quarterbacks: 1 Brett Dietz; 11 Drew Weatherford; Fullbacks: 12 Terrence Royal; Wide receivers: -- Javarus Dudley; 4 Hank Edwards; 2 Sedrick Robinson; 13 DeAndrew Rubin; 5 Tyrone Timmons	Offensive linemen: 77 Emmanuel Akah; 75 Thomas Kaleita; -- Lincoln Kennedy; 68 Robbie Powell; Defensive linemen: 6 Clifford Dukes; 3 Kelvin Kinney; 8 Tim McGill; 98 Jermaine Smith	Linebackers: 55 Eric Ortiz; Defensive backs: 9 Daryon Brutley; 21 Michael Hawthorne; 17 Brandon Hefflin; 19 Erick McIntosh; 28 Jonathan Ordway; Kickers: 18 Garrett Rivas	Injured Reserve: 14 Deonte Bolden DB; -- Greg Hammond; 10 James McCoy DB; 15 Cleannord Saintil WR; 22 Lawrence Samuels WR; Other League Exempt: currently vacant; Refused to Report: -- Talon Saint-Michaels WR; Team Suspension: currently vacant; rookies in italics Roster updated August 11, 2010; 22 Active, 6 Inactive

== Regular season ==
=== Week 1: at Tulsa Talons ===
Quarter	1	2	3	4	Total
Storm	14	16	7	21	58
Talons	14	21	14	20	69

at BOK Center, Tulsa, Oklahoma

- Date: April 3
- Game time: 8:00 pm EDT
- Game attendance: 6,688
- Recap^{[usurped]}

Game information

1st quarter

- Tulsa – Carlese Franklin 17-yard pass from Justin Allgood (Tony Dodson kick), 10:54
- Tampa Bay – Hank Edwards 17-yard pass from Brett Dietz (Garrett Rivas kick), 8:33
- Tulsa – Jeff Hughley 1-yard run (Tony Dodson kick), 4:32
- Tampa Bay – Tyrone Timmons 42-yard pass from Brett Dietz (Garrett Rivas kick), 3:00

2nd quarter

- Tulsa – Jamar Watson 2-yard pass from Justin Allgood (Tony Dodson kick), 11:00
- Tampa Bay – Hank Edwards 7-yard pass from Brett Dietz (Garrett Rivas kick no good), 6:49
- Tulsa – Jeff Hughley 32-yard pass from Justin Allgood (Tony Dodson kick), 4:49
- Tampa Bay – Tyrone Timmons 5-yard pass from Brett Dietz (Garrett Rivas kick), 0:54
- Tulsa – Jamar Watson 3-yard run (Tony Dodson kick), 0:30
- Tampa Bay – Garrett Rivas 37-yard field goal, 0:00

3rd quarter

- Tulsa – Carlese Franklin 4-yard pass from Justin Allgood (Tony Dodson kick), 10:53
- Tampa Bay – Tyrone Timmons 24-yard pass from Brett Dietz (Garrett Rivas kick), 9:27
- Tulsa – Donovan Morgan 10-yard pass from Justin Allgood (Tony Dodson kick), 5:37

4th quarter

- Tulsa – Donovan Morgan 4-yard pass from Justin Allgood (Tony Dodson kick), 12:44
- Tampa Bay – Tyrone Timmons 11-yard pass from Brett Dietz (Garrett Rivas kick), 9:43
- Tampa Bay – Hank Edwards 23-yard pass from Brett Dietz (Garrett Rivas kick), 5:46
- Tulsa – Donovan Morgan 11-yard pass from Justin Allgood (Tony Dodson kick), 3:52
- Tulsa – Donovan Morgan 9-yard pass from Justin Allgood (Antwan Floyd pass no good), 1:00
- Tampa Bay – Tyrone Timmons 25-yard pass from Brett Dietz (Garrett Rivas kick), 0:30

Passing

- Tampa Bay – Brett Dietz: 25/44, 346 yards, 8 TD, 1 INT
- Tulsa – Justin Allgood: 26/36, 274 yards, 8 TD

Rushing

- Tampa Bay – Brett Dietz: 1 att, 4 yards
- Tulsa – Carlese Franklin: 3 att, 18 yards

Receiving

- Tampa Bay – Tyrone Timmons: 11 rec, 181 yards, 5 TD
- Tulsa – Donovan Morgan: 9 rec, 120 yards, 4 TD

In a game that saw neither team have consecutive scores until the 4th quarter, the Storm were defeated 69–58 after giving up two late touchdowns and being unable to mount a final comeback. The Storm committed just two turnovers in the game, but were unable to force any turnovers of their own. Quarterback Brett Dietz threw for 346 yards and 8 touchdowns, while wide receiver Tyrone Timmons had 181 yards on 11 catches and 5 touchdowns.

=== Week 3: vs. Dallas Vigilantes ===
Quarter	1	2	3	4	Total
Vigilantes	14	7	7	13	41
Storm	7	20	6	21	54

at St. Pete Times Forum, Tampa, Florida

- Date: April 16
- Game time: 7:30 pm EDT
- Game attendance: 14,122
- Referee: Kevin Stine
- Recap^{[usurped]}

Game information

1st quarter

- Dallas – Kenny Henderson 52-yard kickoff return (Mark Lewis kick), 14:01
- Tampa Bay – Cleannord Saintil 3-yard run (Garrett Rivas kick), 8:44
- Dallas – Derek Lee 9-yard pass from Collin Drafts (Mark Lewis kick), 3:41

2nd quarter

- Tampa Bay – Cleannord Saintil 3-yard run (Garrett Rivas kick no good), 10:16
- Dallas – Kenny Henderson 29-yard pass from Collin Drafts (Mark Lewis kick), 7:36
- Tampa Bay – Tyrone Timmons 13-yard pass from Brett Dietz (Garrett Rivas kick), 5:16
- Tampa Bay – Tyrone Timmons 8-yard pass from Brett Dietz (Garrett Rivas kick), 0:15

3rd quarter

- Dallas – Collin Drafts 15-yard run (Mark Lewis kick), 6:43
- Tampa Bay – Hank Edwards 44-yard pass from Brett Dietz (Garrett Rivas kick no good), 4:36

4th quarter

- Tampa Bay – Tyrone Timmons 8-yard pass from Brett Dietz (Garrett Rivas kick), 14:08
- Dallas – Derek Lee 34-yard pass from Collin Drafts (Mark Lewis kick), 12:36
- Tampa Bay – Cleannord Saintil 20-yard pass from Brett Dietz (Garrett Rivas kick), 10:54
- Tampa Bay – Tyrone Timmons 5-yard pass from Brett Dietz (Garrett Rivas kick), 2:15
- Dallas – Kenny Henderson 9-yard pass from Collin Drafts (Collin Drafts pass no good), 0:19

Passing

- Dallas – Collin Drafts: 21/30, 212 yards, 4 TD, 1 INT
- Tampa Bay – Brett Dietz: 30/45, 320 yards, 6 TD

Rushing

- Dallas – Collin Drafts: 3 att, 27 yards, 1 TD
- Tampa Bay – Cleannord Saintil: 2 att, 6 yards, 2 TD

Receiving

- Dallas – Derek Lee: 6 rec, 88 yards, 2 TD
- Tampa Bay – Tyrone Timmons: 11 rec, 108 yards, 4 TD

A goal-line stand near the end of the 1st half helped the Storm earn their first win of the season. With under a minute left in the half, the Storm defense stopped Dallas on a 4th and goal from the 1-yard line. Following the change of possession, quarterback Brett Dietz found Tyrone Timmons in the end zone on the sixth play of the ensuing drive to give Tampa Bay the lead at halftime, which was also their first lead of the game. After trailing by a single point for a brief time in the 3rd quarter, the Storm quickly retook the lead and never gave it back to their opponent, defeating the Vigilantes 54–41. Dietz finished with 320 passing yards and 6 touchdowns. Timmons led all receivers with 108 yards and 4 touchdowns.

=== Week 4: at Milwaukee Iron ===
Quarter	1	2	3	4	Total
Storm	14	20	14	13	61
Iron	14	17	21	20	72

at Bradley Center, Milwaukee, Wisconsin

- Date: April 25
- Game time: 5:00 pm EDT
- Recap

Game information

1st quarter

- Milwaukee – Damian Harrell 15-yard pass from Chris Greisen (Robert Forstrom kick), 11:52
- Tampa Bay – Hank Edwards Edwards 17-yard pass from Brett Dietz (Garrett Rivas kick), 9:22
- Milwaukee – Anthony Jones 7-yard pass from Chris Greisen (Robert Forstrom kick), 6:15
- Tampa Bay – Cleannord Saintil 1-yard run (Garrett Rivas kick), 1:12

2nd quarter

- Milwaukee – Damian Harrell 8-yard pass from Chris Greisen (Robert Forstrom kick), 11:29
- Tampa Bay – Cleannord Saintil 11-yard pass from Brett Dietz (Garrett Rivas kick), 6:40
- Milwaukee – Tyre Young 3-yard run (Robert Forstrom kick), 3:15
- Tampa Bay – Tyrone Timmons 36-yard pass from Brett Dietz (Garrett Rivas kick), 0:56
- Milwaukee – Robert Forstrom 13-yard field goal
- Tampa Bay – Cleannord Saintil 32-yard pass from Brett Dietz (Garrett Rivas kick no good), 0:21

3rd quarter

- Tampa Bay – Cleannord Saintil 15-yard pass from Brett Dietz (Garrett Rivas kick), 13:39
- Milwaukee – Damian Harrell 4-yard pass from Chris Greisen (Robert Forstrom kick), 9:03
- Milwaukee – Anthony Jones 5-yard pass from Chris Greisen (Robert Forstrom kick), 6:33
- Tampa Bay – Cleannord Saintil 20-yard pass from Brett Dietz (Garrett Rivas kick), 5:11
- Milwaukee – Anthony Jones 6-yard pass from Chris Greisen (Robert Forstrom kick), 1:17

4th quarter

- Milwaukee – Chris Greisen 2-yard run (Robert Forstrom kick), 8:44
- Tampa Bay – Cleannord Saintil 1-yard run (Garrett Rivas kick no good), 5:08
- Milwaukee – Nate Forse 9-yard pass from Chris Greisen (Robert Forstrom kick), 3:48
- Tampa Bay – Tyrone Timmons 35-yard pass from Brett Dietz (Garrett Rivas kick), 1:55
- Milwaukee – Tyre Young 1-yard run (Robert Forstrom kick no good), 0:44

Passing

- Tampa Bay – Brett Dietz: 21/34, 316 yards, 7 TD, 2 INT
- Milwaukee – Chris Greisen: 26/41, 270 yards, 7 TD

Rushing

- Tampa Bay – Cleannord Saintil: 1 att, 5 yards, 2 TD
- Milwaukee – Tyre Young: 10 att, 44 yards, 2 TD

Receiving

- Tampa Bay – Cleannord Saintil: 9 rec, 128 yards, 4 TD
- Milwaukee – Nate Forse: 8 rec, 120 yards, 4 TD

Second half turnovers cost the Storm the game in which they led at halftime. Perhaps the most costly turnover was early in the 4th quarter when Tampa Bay had just been given a 1st and goal following a Milwaukee penalty. Cleannord Saintil fumbled the ball inside the Milwaukee 3-yard line, which was recovered by the Iron's Eric Turner. The Iron took full advantage of the miscue with a touchdown drive capped off by a Chris Greisen touchdown run. This put the Storm behind by 11 points, and they were unable to make up the deficit. Brett Dietz threw for 316 yards and 7 touchdowns in the loss, while Saintil led all receivers with 128 yards on 9 receptions and 4 receiving touchdowns.

=== Week 5: vs. Arizona Rattlers ===
Quarter	1	2	3	4	Total
Rattlers	7	14	13	27	61
Storm	14	20	14	14	62

at St. Pete Times Forum, Tampa, Florida

- Date: May 1
- Game time: 7:30 pm EDT
- Game attendance: 12,874
- Referee: Kevin Stine
- Recap

Game information

1st quarter

- Tampa Bay – Hank Edwards 9 yd pass from Brett Dietz (Garrett Rivas kick), 11:21
- Tampa Bay – Hank Edwards 29 yd pass from Brett Dietz (Garrett Rivas kick), 3:54
- Arizona – Brennan Carvalho 1 yd run (Jason Witczak kick), 0:00

2nd quarter

- Tampa Bay – DeAndrew Rubin 39 yd pass from Brett Dietz (Garrett Rivas kick), 13:08
- Arizona – Rod Windsor 15 yd pass from Nick Davila (Jason Witczak kick), 9:15
- Tampa Bay – DeAndrew Rubin 29 yd pass from Brett Dietz (Garrett Rivas kick no good), 4:43
- Arizona – J.J. McKelvey 16 yd pass from Nick Davila (Jason Witczak kick), 0:52
- Tampa Bay – Tyrone Timmons 3 yd pass from Brett Dietz (Garrett Rivas kick), 0:36

3rd quarter

- Arizona – Rod Windsor 7 yd pass from Nick Davila (Jason Witczak kick), 9:49
- Tampa Bay – DeAndrew Rubin 12 yd pass from Brett Dietz (Garrett Rivas kick), 8:31
- Arizona – Nick Davila 13 yd run (Atlas Herrion pass no good), 6:26
- Tampa Bay – DeAndrew Rubin 9 yd pass from Brett Dietz (Garrett Rivas kick), 3:09

4th quarter

- Arizona – J.J. McKelvey 10 yd pass from Nick Davila (Jason Witczak kick), 13:09
- Arizona – Anthony Mix 12 yd pass from Nick Davila (Jason Witczak kick), 9:17
- Tampa Bay – Tyrone Timmons 10 yd pass from Brett Dietz (Garrett Rivas kick no good), 4:33
- Arizona – Anthony Mix 26 yd pass from Nick Davila (Jason Witczak kick), 3:16
- Tampa Bay – DeAndrew Rubin 37 yd pass from Brett Dietz (Terrence Royal pass), 1:25
- Arizona – J.J. McKelvey 3 yd pass from Nick Davila (Anthony Mix pass no good), 0:07

Passing

- Arizona – Nick Davila: 27/47, 314 yards, 7 TD
- Tampa Bay – Brett Dietz: 19/32, 288 yards, 9 TD

Rushing

- Arizona – Rod Windsor: 1 att, 27 yards
- Tampa Bay – Terrence Royal: 1 att, 8 yards

Receiving

- Arizona – J.J. McKelvey: 13 rec, 127 yards, 3 TD
- Tampa Bay – DeAndrew Rubin: 9 rec, 184 yards, 5 TD

The Storm led for almost the entire game, but continued to allow Arizona to creep back into it. Following a fumble recovered by the Rattlers in the 4th quarter, they tied the game at 48–48 on a 12-yard passing touchdown just a few plays later. The Storm would score a touchdown on their next drive with a 10-yard reception by Tyrone Timmons, however kicker Garrett Rivas missed the extra point. The Rattlers would find the end zone on their next play from scrimmage, and with a successful extra point, took their first lead of the night at 55–54. Tampa Bay would retake the lead on a 37-yard pass by Brett Dietz to DeAndrew Rubin. Instead of trying an extra point this time, the Storm went for a two-point conversion. The pass from Dietz to Terrence Royal was successful, putting the Storm ahead 62–55 with 1:25 left for the Rattlers. Arizona put together a 5-play, 46-yard drive in which they never faced a 3rd down, ending in a 3-yard passing touchdown with 7 seconds remaining. They went for two instead of the tie, which would have likely forced overtime, but their attempt was unsuccessful. The Storm recovered the onside kick that ensued and ran out the clock to end the game, winning 72–71. Dietz finished with 288 yards and a season-high 9 touchdowns. His most frequent receiver was DeAndrew Rubin, who caught 9 passes for 184 yards and 5 touchdowns.

For Tim Marcum, the win was his 200th in his career as a head coach in the AFL.

=== Week 6: vs. Jacksonville Sharks ===
Quarter	1	2	3	4	Total
Sharks	12	13	7	14	46
Storm	7	17	7	12	43

at St. Pete Times Forum, Tampa, Florida

- Date: May 7
- Game time: 8:00 pm EDT
- Game attendance: 14,201
- Referee: Kevin Stine
- Recap

Game information

1st quarter

- Tampa Bay – Hank Edwards 20-yard pass from Brett Dietz (Garrett Rivas kick), 12:17
- Jacksonville – Kirby Griffin 2-yard run (Mossimo Sbaccia kick no good), 8:24
- Jacksonville – Sale' Key 22-yard pass from Aaron Garcia (Mossimo Sbaccia kick no good), 4:51

2nd quarter

- Tampa Bay – Terrence Royal 2-yard run (Garrett Rivas kick), 14:20
- Jacksonville – Jomo Wilson 18-yard pass from Aaron Garcia (Mossimo Sbaccia kick), 11:13
- Tampa Bay – Tyrone Timmons 3-yard pass from Brett Dietz (Garrett Rivas kick), 7:40
- Jacksonville – Jomo Wilson 1-yard run (Mossimo Sbaccia kick blocked), 1:59
- Tampa Bay – Garrett Rivas 19-yard field goal, 0:00

3rd quarter

- Tampa Bay – DeAndrew Rubin 32-yard pass from Brett Dietz (Garrett Rivas kick), 11:13
- Jacksonville – Jomo Wilson 28-yard pass from Aaron Garcia (Mossimo Sbaccia kick), 9:27

4th quarter

- Tampa Bay – DeAndrew Rubin 29-yard pass from Brett Dietz (Garrett Rivas kick no good), 12:36
- Jacksonville – Jomo Wilson 10-yard pass from Aaron Garcia (Aaron Garcia pass no good)
- Tampa Bay – Tyrone Timmons 11-yard pass from Brett Dietz (Drew Weatherford run no good), 1:00
- Jacksonville – Sale' Key 4-yard pass from Aaron Garcia (Bernard Morris run), 0:36

Passing

- Jacksonville – Aaron Garcia: 27/44, 342 yards, 5 TD, 2 INT
- Tampa Bay – Brett Dietz: 22/35, 293 yards, 5 TD, 2 INT

Rushing

- Jacksonville – Jomo Wilson: 1 att, 1 yard, 1 TD
- Tampa Bay – Terrence Royal: 3 att, 1 yard, 1 TD

Receiving

- Jacksonville – Jomo Wilson: 10 rec, 148 yards, 3 TD
- Tampa Bay – DeAndrew Rubin: 8 rec, 147 yards, 2 TD

The game, while low scoring, was tight throughout the night, as neither team led by more than 6 points at any time. The Storm were up by 5 points in the final minute after a Tyrone Timmons 11-yard touchdown catch, but Tampa Bay's defense gave up a touchdown on the Sharks' ensuing drive. Down 46–43 and having 36 seconds to work with on the clock, DeAndrew Rubin fumbled 15 yards from the end zone after catching a pass. The loose ball was recovered by the Sharks, who ran out the clock to end the game. It was Tampa Bay's fifth giveaway in the game. Brett Dietz threw 2 interceptions along with his 293 passing yards and 5 touchdowns. Despite the late turnover, Rubin was the team's leading receiver with 147 yards and a pair of touchdown receptions.

=== Week 7: at Bossier–Shreveport Battle Wings ===
Quarter	1	2	3	4	Total
Storm	6	14	7	21	48
Battle Wings	6	16	7	15	44

at CenturyTel Center, Bossier City, Louisiana

- Date: May 15
- Game time: 8:05 pm EDT
- Game attendance: 4,784
- Referee: Scott Vaughn
- Recap^{[usurped]}

Game information

1st quarter

- Bossier–Shreveport – P.J. Berry 36-yard pass from Raymond Philyaw (Nick Gatto kick no good), 4:29
- Tampa Bay – Tyrone Timmons 7-yard pass from Brett Dietz (Garrett Rivas kick no good), 2:31

2nd quarter

- Bossier–Shreveport – P.J. Berry 2-yard pass from Raymond Philyaw (Nick Gatto kick no good), 11:48
- Bossier–Shreveport – Nick Gatto 22-yard field goal, 7:48
- Tampa Bay – Terrence Royal 2-yard run (Garrett Rivas kick), 4:50
- Bossier–Shreveport – Byron Douzart 28-yard run (Nick Gatto kick), 2:32
- Tampa Bay – DeAndrew Rubin 3-yard pass from Brett Dietz (Garrett Rivas kick), 0:10

3rd quarter

- Tampa Bay – Terrence Royal 3-yard pass from Brett Dietz (Garrett Rivas kick), 6:00
- Bossier–Shreveport – Willis Marshall 3-yard run (Nick Gatto kick), 0:20

4th quarter

- Tampa Bay – DeAndrew Rubin 18-yard pass from Brett Dietz (Garrett Rivas kick), 10:59
- Bossier–Shreveport – Randy Hymes 48-yard pass from Raymond Philyaw (Randy Hymes pass), 9:14
- Tampa Bay – DeAndrew Rubin 27-yard pass from Brett Dietz (Garrett Rivas kick), 5:42
- Bossier–Shreveport – Willis Marshall 2-yard run (Nick Gatto kick), 1:00
- Tampa Bay – Tyrone Timmons 2-yard pass from Brett Dietz (Garrett Rivas kick), 0:13

Passing

- Tampa Bay – Brett Dietz: 34/41, 398 yards, 6 TD, 1 INT
- Bossier–Shreveport – Raymond Philyaw: 20/36, 245 yards, 3 TD, 2 INT

Rushing

- Tampa Bay – Terrence Royal: 6 att, 12 yards, 1 TD
- Bossier–Shreveport – Byron Douzart: 5 att, 74 yards, 1 TD

Receiving

- Tampa Bay – DeAndrew Rubin: 7 rec, 116 yards, 3 TD
- Bossier–Shreveport – Randy Hymes: 6 rec, 115 yards, 1 TD

=== Week 9: at Orlando Predators ===
Quarter	1	2	3	4	Total
Storm	14	21	13	14	62
Predators	10	7	6	27	50

at Amway Arena, Orlando, Florida

- Date: May 28
- Game time: 8:00 pm EDT
- Game attendance: 10,924
- Referee: Greg Lefils
- Recap

Game information

1st quarter

- Orlando – Carlos Martinez 46-yard field goal, 12:11
- Tampa Bay – Hank Edwards 23-yard pass from Brett Dietz (Garrett Rivas kick), 9:36
- Orlando – T.T. Toliver 23-yard pass from Nick Hill (Carlos Martinez kick), 6:28
- Tampa Bay – Hank Edwards 28-yard pass from Brett Dietz (Garrett Rivas kick), 5:20

2nd quarter

- Tampa Bay – DeAndrew Rubin 26-yard pass from Brett Dietz (Garrett Rivas kick), 10:17
- Orlando – Bobby Sippio 3-yard pass from Nick Hill (Carlos Martinez kick), 8:09
- Tampa Bay – Tyrone Timmons 28-yard pass from Brett Dietz (Garrett Rivas kick), 5:10
- Tampa Bay – DeAndrew Rubin 21-yard pass from Brett Dietz (Garrett Rivas kick), 1:00

3rd quarter

- Orlando – T.T. Toliver 4-yard pass from Nick Hill (Carlos Martinez kick no good), 10:24
- Tampa Bay – Hank Edwards 10-yard pass from Brett Dietz (Garrett Rivas kick), 6:32
- Tampa Bay – Terrence Royal 1-yard run (Garrett Rivas kick no good), 0:11

4th quarter

- Orlando – T.T. Toliver 26-yard pass from Nick Hill (Antoine "T.T." Toliver pass no good)
- Tampa Bay – DeAndrew Rubin 3-yard pass from Brett Dietz (Garrett Rivas kick), 11:13
- Orlando – Bobby Sippio 15-yard pass from Nick Hill (Carlos Martinez kick), 7:32
- Orlando – Bobby Sippio 26-yard pass from Nick Hill (Carlos Martinez kick), 4:45
- Orlando – Bobby Sippio 1-yard run (Carlos Martinez kick), 2:16
- Tampa Bay – Terrence Royal 1-yard run (Garrett Rivas kick), 0:34

Passing

- Tampa Bay – Brett Dietz: 22/30, 304 yards, 7 TD, 2 INT
- Orlando – Nick Hill: 31/47, 393 yards, 6 TD, 1 INT

Rushing

- Tampa Bay – Terrence Royal: 5 att, 0 yards, 2 TD
- Orlando – Nick Hill: 3 att, 4 yards

Receiving

- Tampa Bay – Hank Edwards: 7 rec, 104 yards, 3 TD
- Orlando – Bobby Sippio: 12 rec, 170 yards, 3 TD

=== Week 10: vs. Oklahoma City Yard Dawgz ===
Quarter	1	2	3	4	Total
Yard Dawgz	7	14	14	13	48
Storm	14	14	13	9	50

at St. Pete Times Forum, Tampa, Florida

- Date: June 5
- Game time: 7:30 pm EDT
- Game attendance: 16,200
- Referee: Kevin Stine
- Recap

Game information

1st quarter

- Oklahoma City – Timon Marshall 28-yard pass from Tommy Grady (Andy Eminger kick), 10:30
- Tampa Bay – Hank Edwards 14-yard pass from Brett Dietz (Garrett Rivas kick), 7:31
- Tampa Bay – DeAndrew Rubin 9-yard pass from Brett Dietz (Garrett Rivas kick), 0:24

2nd quarter

- Oklahoma City – Timon Marshall 34-yard pass from Tommy Grady (Andy Eminger kick), 13:24
- Tampa Bay – Hank Edwards 4-yard pass from Brett Dietz (Garrett Rivas kick), 7:31
- Tampa Bay – Tyrone Timmons 10-yard pass from Brett Dietz (Garrett Rivas kick), 1:00
- Oklahoma City – Al Hunt 2-yard run (Andy Eminger kick), 0:00

3rd quarter

- Oklahoma City – Anthony Hines 11-yard pass from Tommy Grady (Andy Eminger kick), 9:44
- Tampa Bay – Hank Edwards 19-yard pass from Brett Dietz (Garrett Rivas kick no good), 7:52
- Oklahoma City – Anthony Hines 10-yard pass from Tommy Grady (Andy Eminger kick), 5:24
- Tampa Bay – Hank Edwards 9-yard pass from Brett Dietz (Garrett Rivas kick), 1:00

4th quarter

- Oklahoma City – Kevin McCollough 46-yard interception return (Andy Eminger kick), 11:35
- Tampa Bay – Safety, 3:36
- Tampa Bay – Terrence Royal 40-yard run (Garrett Rivas kick), 2:30
- Oklahoma City – Chad Cook 3-yard run (Chad Cook run no good), 0:09

Passing

- Oklahoma City – Tommy Grady: 18/36, 192 yards, 4 TD
- Tampa Bay – Brett Dietz: 18/35, 226 yards, 6 TD, 2 INT

Rushing

- Oklahoma City – Chad Cook: 4 att, 17 yards, 1 TD
- Tampa Bay – Terrence Royal: 3 att, 43 yards, 1 TD

Receiving

- Oklahoma City – Timon Marshall: 6 rec, 87 yards, 2 TD
- Tampa Bay – Hank Edwards: 9 rec, 102 yards, 4 TD

=== Week 11: at Alabama Vipers ===
Quarter	1	2	3	4	Total
Storm	13	28	10	10	61
Vipers	7	13	14	21	55

at Von Braun Center, Huntsville, Alabama

- Date: June 12
- Game time: 9:30 pm EDT
- Game attendance: 5,994
- Recap

Game information

1st quarter

- Tampa Bay – Hank Edwards 11-yard pass from Brett Dietz (Garrett Rivas kick blocked), 9:17
- Tampa Bay – DeAndrew Rubin 23-yard pass from Brett Dietz (Garrett Rivas kick), 5:11
- Alabama – C.J. Johnson 6-yard pass from Kevin Eakin (Brian Jackson kick), 1:09

2nd quarter

- Tampa Bay – DeAndrew Rubin 6-yard pass from Brett Dietz (Garrett Rivas kick), 14:16
- Alabama – Dan Alexander 1-yard run (Brian Jackson kick), 8:57
- Tampa Bay – Sedrick Robinson 30-yard pass from Brett Dietz (Garrett Rivas kick), 4:02
- Tampa Bay – Michael Hawthorne 10-yard interception return (Garrett Rivas kick), 1:20
- Alabama – Larry Shipp 17-yard pass from Kevin Eakin (Brian Jackson kick blocked), 0:38
- Tampa Bay – Thomas Kaleita 8-yard pass from Brett Dietz (Garrett Rivas kick), 0:06

3rd quarter

- Tampa Bay – Garrett Rivas 13-yard field goal, 9:59
- Alabama – Larry Shipp 23-yard pass from Kevin Eakin (Brian Jackson kick), 6:07
- Tampa Bay – James Bear 5-yard run (Garrett Rivas kick), 4:58
- Alabama – Larry Shipp 22-yard pass from Kevin Eakin (Brian Jackson kick), 2:45

4th quarter

- Tampa Bay – Garrett Rivas 15-yard field goal, 10:24
- Alabama – C.J. Johnson 34-yard pass from Kevin Eakin (Brian Jackson kick), 8:12
- Tampa Bay – Hank Edwards 11-yard pass from Brett Dietz (Garrett Rivas kick), 5:09
- Alabama – Jeremy Grier 9-yard pass from Kevin Eakin (Brian Jackson kick), 1:09
- Alabama – Larry Shipp 38-yard pass from Kevin Eakin (Brian Jackson kick), 0:25

Passing

- Tampa Bay – Brett Dietz: 20/36, 258 yards, 6 TD
- Alabama – Kevin Eakin: 32/44, 396 yards, 7 TD, 2 INT

Rushing

- Tampa Bay – James Bear: 2 att, 5 yards, 1 TD
- Alabama – Kevin Eakin: 1 att, 5 yards

Receiving

- Tampa Bay – Hank Edwards: 6 rec, 112 yards, 2 TD
- Alabama – Larry Shipp: 14 rec, 208 yards, 4 TD

=== Week 12: at Utah Blaze ===
Quarter	1	2	3	4	Total
Storm	21	14	16	14	65
Blaze	6	21	13	0	40

at Maverik Center, West Valley City, Utah

- Date: June 19
- Game time: 9:30 pm EDT
- Game attendance: 4,525
- Referee: Steve Strimling
- Recap^{[usurped]}

Game information

1st quarter

- Tampa Bay – Hank Edwards 36-yard pass from Brett Dietz (Garrett Rivas kick), 13:46
- Tampa Bay – Tyrone Timmons 41-yard pass from Brett Dietz (Garrett Rivas kick), 10:11
- Utah – Damian Walker 4-yard run (Ben Scott kick no good), 6:24
- Tampa Bay – DeAndrew Rubin 32-yard pass from Brett Dietz (Garrett Rivas kick), 4:32

2nd quarter

- Utah – Aaron Boone 3-yard pass from Brett Elliott (Ben Scott kick), 13:20
- Tampa Bay – Hank Edwards 15-yard pass from Brett Dietz (Garrett Rivas kick), 11:37
- Utah – Aaron Boone 20-yard pass from Brett Elliott (Ben Scott kick), 10:33
- Utah – Chris Francies 18-yard pass from Brett Elliott (Ben Scott kick), 4:08
- Tampa Bay – Hank Edwards 16-yard pass from Brett Dietz (Garrett Rivas kick), 0:08

3rd quarter

- Tampa Bay – Hank Edwards 14-yard pass from Brett Dietz (Garrett Rivas kick), 9:48
- Utah – Chris Solomona 7-yard pass from Brett Elliott (Ben Scott kick blocked), 7:51
- Tampa Bay – Tyrone Timmons 23-yard pass from Brett Dietz (Garrett Rivas kick), 4:06
- Utah – Akamu Aki 14-yard pass from Brett Elliott (Ben Scott kick), 0:34

4th quarter

- Tampa Bay – Tyrone Timmons 19-yard pass from Brett Dietz (Garrett Rivas kick), 13:12
- Tampa Bay – Hank Edwards 4-yard pass from Brett Dietz (Garrett Rivas kick), 11:24

Passing

- Tampa Bay – Brett Dietz: 23/37, 323 yards, 9 TD, 1 INT
- Utah – Brett Elliott: 19/33, 179 yards, 5 TD, 3 INT

Rushing

- Tampa Bay – Terrence Royal: 3 att, 10 yards
- Utah – Damian Walker: 1 att, 4 yards, 1 TD

Receiving

- Tampa Bay – Hank Edwards: 14 rec, 195 yards, 5 TD
- Utah – Aaron Boone: 10 rec, 106 yards, 2 TD

=== Week 13: vs. Bossier–Shreveport Battle Wings ===
Quarter	1	2	3	4	Total
Battle Wings	13	14	0	12	39
Storm	14	30	20	14	78

at St. Pete Times Forum, Tampa, Florida

- Date: June 25
- Game time: 8:00 pm EDT
- Game attendance: 15,808
- Referee: Kevin Stine
- Recap

Game information

1st quarter

- Bossier–Shreveport – PJ Berry 26-yard pass from Jimmy Welker (PJ Berry run no good), 11:53
- Tampa Bay – Hank Edwards 32-yard pass from Brett Dietz (Garrett Rivas kick), 8:53
- Bossier–Shreveport – James Jordan 28-yard pass from Jimmy Welker (Nick Gatto kick), 6:12
- Tampa Bay – DeAndrew Rubin 28-yard pass from Brett Dietz (Garrett Rivas kick), 1:06

2nd quarter

- Bossier–Shreveport – Jason Schule 24-yard run (Nick Gatto kick), 12:55
- Tampa Bay – Tyrone Timmons 33-yard pass from Brett Dietz (Garrett Rivas kick), 12:06
- Tampa Bay – Safety, 9:59
- Tampa Bay – Tyrone Timmons 17-yard pass from Brett Dietz (Garrett Rivas kick), 7:46
- Bossier–Shreveport – Christian Wise 34-yard pass from Jimmy Welker (Nick Gatto kick), 4:00
- Tampa Bay – Terrence Royal 1-yard run (Garrett Rivas kick), 2:02
- Tampa Bay – Hank Edwards 14-yard pass from Brett Dietz (Garrett Rivas kick), 0:06

3rd quarter

- Tampa Bay – Michael Hawthorne 0-yard fumble return (Garrett Rivas kick), 8:38
- Tampa Bay – Tyrone Timmons 14-yard pass from Brett Dietz (Garrett Rivas kick no good), 5:13
- Tampa Bay – Tyrone Timmons 8-yard pass from Brett Dietz (Garrett Rivas kick), 2:00

4th quarter

- Bossier–Shreveport – P.J. Berry 28-yard pass from Jimmy Welker (Nick Gatto kick blocked)
- Tampa Bay – Tyrone Timmons 11-yard pass from Brett Dietz (Garrett Rivas kick), 11:01
- Tampa Bay – Hank Edwards 24-yard pass from Drew Weatherford (Garrett Rivas kick), 4:42
- Bossier–Shreveport – Jason Schule 1-yard run (Nick Gatto kick blocked), 0:55

Passing

- Bossier–Shreveport – Jimmy Welker: 14/33, 239 yards, 4 TD, 3 INT
- Tampa Bay – Brett Dietz: 22/30, 342 yards, 8 TD

Rushing

- Bossier–Shreveport – Jason Schule: 4 att, 30 yards, 2 TD
- Tampa Bay – Terrence Royal: 5 att, 10 yards, 1 TD

Receiving

- Bossier–Shreveport – P.J. Berry: 4 rec, 72 yards, 2 TD
- Tampa Bay – Hank Edwards: 10 rec, 209 yards, 3 TD

=== Week 14: vs. Chicago Rush ===
Quarter	1	2	3	4	Total
Rush	13	21	7	19	60
Storm	14	21	14	19	68

at St. Pete Times Forum, Tampa, Florida

- Date: July 2
- Game time: 8:00 pm EDT
- Game attendance: 15,704
- Referee: Kevin Stine
- Recap

Game information

1st quarter

- Chicago – Allen Turner 42-yard pass from Russ Michna (Chris Gould kick), 13:39
- Tampa Bay – Hank Edwards 30-yard pass from Brett Dietz (Garrett Rivas kick), 11:20
- Chicago – Allen Turner 10-yard pass from Russ Michna (Chris Gould kick no good), 8:11
- Tampa Bay – Hank Edwards 8-yard pass from Brett Dietz (Garrett Rivas kick), 4:17

2nd quarter

- Chicago – Allen Turner 4-yard pass from Russ Michna (Chris Gould kick), 12:51
- Tampa Bay – Sedrick Robinson 6-yard pass from Brett Dietz (Garrett Rivas kick), 8:13
- Chicago – Palauni Ma Sun 10-yard pass from Russ Michna (Chris Gould kick), 3:53
- Tampa Bay – Tyrone Timmons 23-yard pass from Brett Dietz (Garrett Rivas kick), 1:18
- Chicago – Clifton Smith 3-yard run (Chris Gould kick), 0:34
- Tampa Bay – Terrence Royal 1-yard run (Garrett Rivas kick), 0:07

3rd quarter

- Tampa Bay – Hank Edwards 45-yard pass from Brett Dietz (Garrett Rivas kick), 13:47
- Chicago – Marco Thomas 13-yard pass from Russ Michna (Chris Gould kick), 9:46
- Tampa Bay – Hank Edwards 15-yard pass from Brett Dietz (Garrett Rivas kick), 4:22

4th quarter

- Chicago – Syvelle Newton 4-yard pass from Russ Michna (Chris Gould kick no good), 14:14
- Tampa Bay – Tyrone Timmons 5-yard pass from Brett Dietz (Garrett Rivas kick no good), 11:07
- Chicago – Clifton Smith 2-yard run (DeJuan Alfonzo no good), 3:38
- Tampa Bay – Tyrone Timmons 6-yard pass from Brett Dietz (Garrett Rivas kick), 2:42
- Tampa Bay – Erick McIntosh 30-yard fumble return (Garrett Rivas kick no good), 0:46
- Chicago – Allen Turner 4-yard pass from Russ Michna (Chris Gould kick), 0:01

Passing

- Chicago – Russ Michna: 26/38, 334 yards, 7 TD
- Tampa Bay – Brett Dietz: 24/31, 359 yards, 8 TD

Rushing

- Chicago – Russ Michna: 5 att, 23 yards
- Tampa Bay – Terrence Royal: 1 att, 1 yard, 1 TD

Receiving

- Chicago – Marco Thomas: 12 rec, 176 yards, 1 TD
- Tampa Bay – Hank Edwards: 8 rec, 172 yards, 4 TD

=== Week 15: at Dallas Vigilantes ===
Quarter	1	2	3	4	Total
Storm	7	21	14	14	56
Vigilantes	7	17	10	0	34

at American Airlines Center, Dallas, Texas

- Date: July 9
- Game time: 8:00 pm EDT
- Game attendance: 5,009
- Referee: Mark Windham
- Recap

Game information

1st quarter

- Tampa Bay – Sedrick Robinson 30-yard pass from Brett Dietz (Garrett Rivas kick), 10:21
- Dallas – Matt Fields 18-yard pass from Collin Drafts (Mark Lewis kick), 0:15

2nd quarter

- Tampa Bay – Hank Edwards 7-yard pass from Brett Dietz (Garrett Rivas kick), 10:36
- Dallas – Derek Lee 14-yard pass from Collin Drafts (Mark Lewis kick), 6:43
- Tampa Bay – Tyrone Timmons 9-yard pass from Brett Dietz (Garrett Rivas kick), 3:22
- Dallas – Derek Lee 20-yard pass from Collin Drafts (Mark Lewis kick), 0:21
- Tampa Bay – Sedrick Robinson 36-yard pass from Brett Dietz (Garrett Rivas kick), 0:06
- Dallas – Mark Lewis 29-yard field goal, 0:00

3rd quarter

- Dallas – Matt Fields 19-yard pass from Collin Drafts (Mark Lewis kick), 10:41
- Tampa Bay – Tyrone Timmons 21-yard pass from Brett Dietz (Garrett Rivas kick), 7:26
- Tampa Bay – Cliff Dukes 10-yard fumble return (Garrett Rivas kick), 5:09
- Dallas – Mark Lewis 15-yard field goal, 0:37

4th quarter

- Tampa Bay – Hank Edwards 28-yard pass from Brett Dietz (Garrett Rivas kick), 5:22
- Tampa Bay – Terrence Royal 3-yard run (Garrett Rivas kick), 0:00

Passing

- Tampa Bay – Brett Dietz: 20/31, 329 yards, 6 TD, 2 INT
- Dallas – Collin Drafts: 25/42, 228 yards, 4 TD

Rushing

- Tampa Bay – Terrence Royal: 5 att, 10 yards, 1 TD
- Dallas – Duke Pettijohn: 2 att, 5 yards

Receiving

- Tampa Bay – Hank Edwards: 7 rec, 133 yards, 2 TD
- Dallas – Derek Lee: 8 rec, 99 yards, 2 TD

With their eighth consecutive win, the Storm clinched a playoff berth.

=== Week 16: at Jacksonville Sharks ===
Quarter	1	2	3	4	Total
Storm	7	7	14	19	47
Sharks	7	14	7	21	49

at Jacksonville Veterans Memorial Arena, Jacksonville, Florida

- Date: July 17
- Game time: 7:05 pm EDT
- Recap

Game information

1st quarter

- Jacksonville – Jason Willis 16-yard pass from Bernard Morris (Paul Edinger kick), 9:48
- Tampa Bay – Tyrone Timmons 5-yard pass from Brett Dietz (Garrett Rivas kick), 6:36

2nd quarter

- Tampa Bay – Hank Edwards 13-yard pass from Brett Dietz (Garrett Rivas kick), 14:54
- Jacksonville – Kirby Griffin 3-yard run (Paul Edinger kick), 11:34
- Jacksonville – Bernard Morris 19-yard run (Paul Edinger kick), 2:09

3rd quarter

- Tampa Bay – DeAndrew Rubin 25-yard pass from Brett Dietz (Garrett Rivas kick), 13:59
- Jacksonville – Jason Willis 9-yard pass from Bernard Morris (Paul Edinger kick), 8:26
- Tampa Bay – Thomas Kaleita 4-yard pass from Brett Dietz (Garrett Rivas kick), 4:52

4th quarter

- Jacksonville – Dallas Baker 3-yard pass from Bernard Morris (Paul Edinger kick), 14:17
- Tampa Bay – Hank Edwards 15-yard pass from Brett Dietz (Garrett Rivas kick no good), 12:13
- Jacksonville – Dee Webb 4-yard pass from Bernard Morris (Paul Edinger kick), 7:16
- Tampa Bay – Tyrone Timmons 7-yard pass from Brett Dietz (Garrett Rivas kick), 4:39
- Jacksonville – Sale' Key 1-yard run (Paul Edinger kick)
- Tampa Bay – Lawrence Samuels 5-yard pass from Brett Dietz (Tyrone Timmons pass no good), 0:08

Passing

- Tampa Bay – Brett Dietz: 22/32, 297 yards, 7 TD
- Jacksonville – Bernard Morris: 21/40, 228 yards, 4 TD

Rushing

- Tampa Bay – Terrence Royal: 2 att, 2 yards
- Jacksonville – Bernard Morris: 8 att, 30 yards, 1 TD

Receiving

- Tampa Bay – Hank Edwards: 7 rec, 104 yards, 2 TD
- Jacksonville – Jason Willis: 11 rec, 93 yards, 2 TD

=== Week 17: vs. Alabama Vipers ===
Quarter	1	2	3	4	Total
Vipers	10	0	6	13	29
Storm	0	26	21	6	53

at St. Pete Times Forum, Tampa, Florida

- Date: July 24
- Game time: 7:30 pm EDT
- Game attendance: 15,685
- Referee: Tom Symonette
- Recap

Game information

1st quarter

- Alabama – Brian Jackson 27-yard field goal, 6:48
- Alabama – Dan Alexander 33-yard pass from Michael Johnson (Brian Jackson kick), 0:15

2nd quarter

- Tampa Bay – Eric Ortiz 1-yard run (Garrett Rivas kick), 11:07
- Tampa Bay – Eric Ortiz 4-yard run (Garrett Rivas kick), 8:48
- Tampa Bay – Safety, 8:01
- Tampa Bay – Terrence Royal 1-yard run (Garrett Rivas kick), 2:39
- Tampa Bay – Garrett Rivas 13-yard field goal, 0:00

3rd quarter

- Tampa Bay – Hank Edwards 8-yard pass from Brett Dietz (Garrett Rivas kick), 10:30
- Alabama – Dan Alexander 32-yard run (Brian Jackson kick no good), 6:55
- Tampa Bay – Tyrone Timmons 13-yard pass from Brett Dietz (Garrett Rivas kick), 4:25
- Tampa Bay – Michael Hawthorne 0-yard fumble return (Garrett Rivas kick), 3:02

4th quarter

- Tampa Bay – Tyrone Timmons 14-yard pass from Brett Dietz (Garrett Rivas kick no good), 14:18
- Alabama – Dan Alexander 8-yard run (Brian Jackson kick no good), 7:22
- Alabama – C.J. Johnson 11-yard pass from Jeffrey Mroz (Brian Jackson kick), 2:01

Passing

- Alabama – Jeffrey Mroz: 6/12, 44 yards, 1 TD
- Tampa Bay – Brett Dietz: 19/31, 240 yards, 3 TD

Rushing

- Alabama – Dan Alexander: 7 att, 74 yards, 2 TD
- Tampa Bay – Eric Ortiz: 6 att, 7 yards, 2 TD

Receiving

- Alabama – Dan Alexander: 1 rec, 33 yards, 1 TD
- Tampa Bay – Hank Edwards: 7 rec, 88 yards, 1 TD

=== Week 18: vs. Orlando Predators ===
Quarter	1	2	3	4	Total
Predators	28	17	14	16	75
Storm	7	13	8	32	60

at St. Pete Times Forum, Tampa, Florida

- Date: July 31
- Game time: 7:30 pm EDT
- Game attendance: 17,302
- Referee: Kevin Stine
- Recap

Game information

1st quarter

- Orlando – T.T. Toliver 14-yard pass from Nick Hill (Carlos Martinez kick), 10:50
- Tampa Bay – DeAndrew Rubin 42-yard pass from Brett Dietz (Garrett Rivas kick), 8:05
- Orlando – Bobby Sippio 28-yard pass from Nick Hill (Carlos Martinez kick), 6:49
- Orlando – T.T. Toliver 17-yard pass from Nick Hill (Carlos Martinez kick), 4:31
- Orlando – T.T. Toliver 21-yard pass from Nick Hill (Carlos Martinez kick), 1:01

2nd quarter

- Tampa Bay – Terrence Royal 2-yard run (Garrett Rivas kick), 10:45
- Orlando – Bobby Sippio 4-yard pass from Nick Hill (Carlos Martinez kick), 6:58
- Orlando – T.T. Toliver 2-yard pass from Nick Hill (Carlos Martinez kick), 0:41
- Tampa Bay – DeAndrew Rubin 27-yard pass from Brett Dietz (Garrett Rivas kick no good), 0:08
- Orlando – Carlos Martinez 34-yard field goal, 0:00

3rd quarter

- Orlando – T.T. Toliver 8-yard pass from Nick Hill (Carlos Martinez kick), 9:03
- Tampa Bay – Tyrone Timmons 6-yard pass from Brett Dietz (Tyrone Timmons pass), 4:17
- Orlando – Nick Hill 4-yard run (Carlos Martinez kick), 1:44

4th quarter

- Tampa Bay – Eric Ortiz 2-yard run (Tyrone Timmons pass), 13:44
- Orlando – T.T. Toliver 25-yard pass from Nick Hill (Carlos Martinez kick), 12:32
- Tampa Bay – Hank Edwards 3-yard pass from Brett Dietz (Tyrone Timmons pass), 7:18
- Orlando – Carlos Martinez 15-yard field goal, 4:40
- Tampa Bay – DeAndrew Rubin 21-yard pass from Brett Dietz (Kelvin Kinney pass), 2:01
- Orlando – James Bryant 10-yard kickoff return (Carlos Martinez run no good), 1:08
- Tampa Bay – Hank Edwards 7-yard pass from Brett Dietz (DeAndrew Rubin pass), 0:14

Passing

- Orlando – Nick Hill: 19/26, 284 yards, 8 TD
- Tampa Bay – Brett Dietz: 32/49, 310 yards, 7 TD, 3 INT

Rushing

- Orlando – Nick Hill: 4 att, 10 yards, 1 TD
- Tampa Bay – Terrence Royal: 1 att, 2 yards, 1 TD

Receiving

- Orlando – T.T. Toliver: 9 rec, 123 yards, 6 TD
- Tampa Bay – DeAndrew Rubin: 17 rec, 245 yards, 3 TD

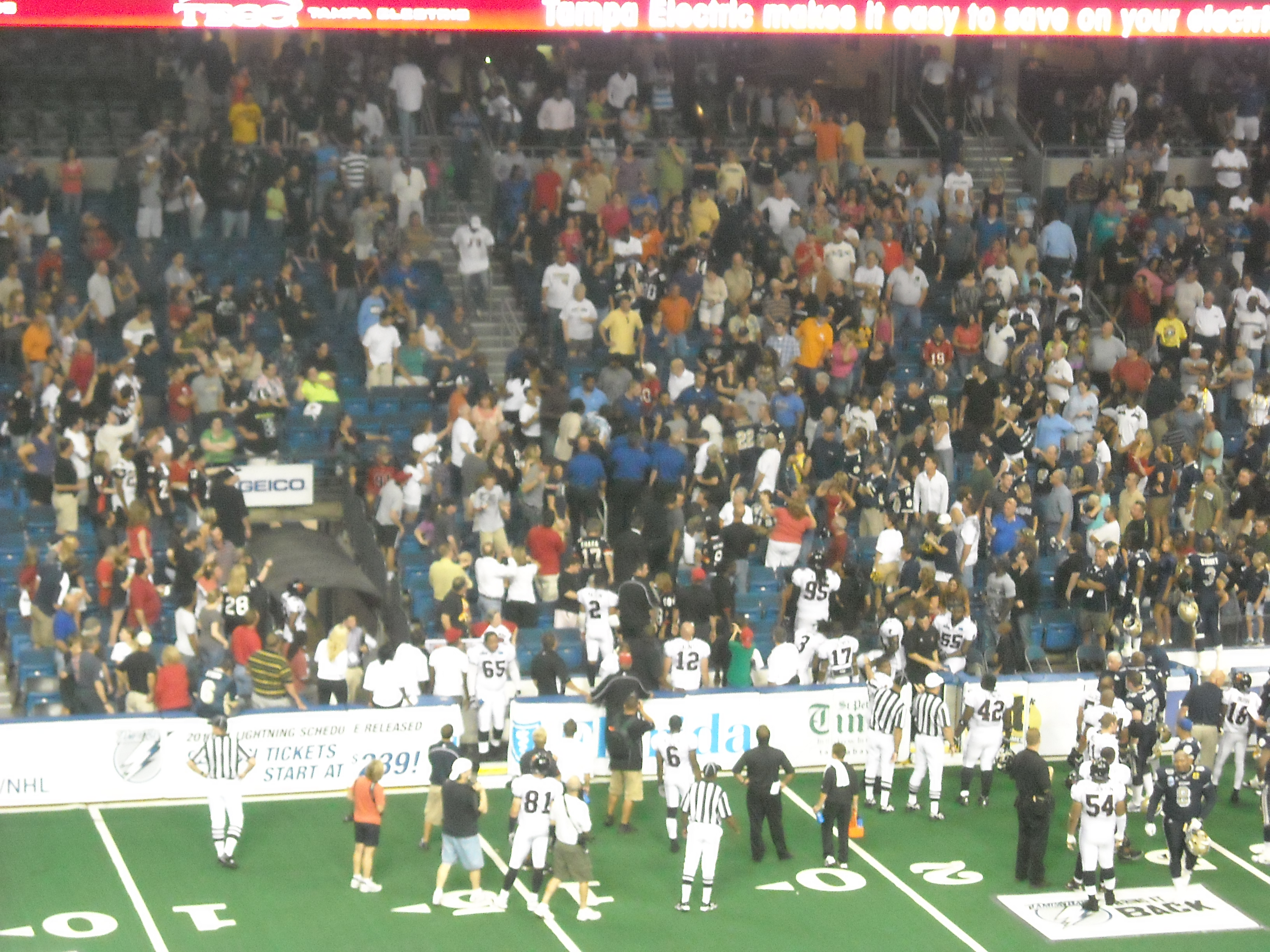
Security tries to get the situation under control after two Orlando players entered the stands and fought with fans.

The Storm looked to take their second win in The War on I-4 in 2010. They entered the game having already known the Jacksonville Sharks wrapped up the division championship with a win the night before. This meant that win or lose to the Preds, the Storm would be heading to Tulsa for the conference semifinals against the Talons.

Still, the Storm fell behind early against the Predators as quarterback Brett Dietz threw two interceptions in the 1st quarter, and Orlando capitalized on both turnovers with a pair of touchdown drives. In the second quarter, both teams scored two touchdowns each, but the Predators took a 45–20 lead into halftime with a 23-yard field goal as time expired. The closest Tampa Bay would get in the 2nd half was a 15-point deficit, after a 7-yard Hank Edwards touchdown reception with 14 seconds left in the 4th quarter, losing the game 75–60. Head coach Tim Marcum commented after the game, "It was a butt whipping, and we supplied the butt."

Dietz's 310 passing yards gave him 5,054 for the season, a new single-season record for Tampa Bay. His six touchdown passes raised his season total to 106, another single-season record that had already been surpassed by the quarterback in the weeks before. DeAndrew Rubin was the leading receiver in the game, and also set a couple of single-game records for the Storm with 17 receptions and 245 yards.

The game itself took an ugly turn shortly before halftime because of an altercation between fans and two Orlando players. Center Julius Wilson reportedly attempted to toss a football to his father in the stands behind the Predator bench, however a fan knocked the ball away from the hands of Wilson's father, and as other fans scrambled to get the ball, Wilson's father was knocked down. Receiver Bobby Sippio went into the seats as his own father was near the area of the incident. Wilson eventually went into the stands as well, and threw a punch at a fan, which resulted in a fight breaking out. Both players were ejected from the game and were given suspensions. Sippio, who was given a suspension of one game, appealed, allowing him to participate in the playoffs. Wilson was given a six game suspension that he was not allowed to appeal because it was not his first ejection that season. Ten fans were also escorted away. No arrests were made.

== Playoffs ==
=== American Conference Semifinals: at Tulsa Talons ===
Quarter	1	2	3	4	Total
Storm	14	20	20	14	68
Talons	6	13	7	12	38

at BOK Center, Tulsa, Oklahoma

- Date: August 7
- Game time: 8:00 pm EDT
- Recap

Game information

1st quarter

- Tulsa – Donovan Morgan 17-yard pass from Justin Allgood (Marco Capozzoli kick no good), 13:01
- Tampa Bay – Eric Ortiz 3-yard run (Garrett Rivas kick), 9:32
- Tampa Bay – Tyrone Timmons 8-yard pass from Brett Dietz (Garrett Rivas kick), 2:23

2nd quarter

- Tampa Bay – Hank Edwards 38-yard pass from Brett Dietz (Garrett Rivas kick no good), 11:23
- Tulsa – Donovan Morgan 2-yard pass from Justin Allgood (Marco Capozzoli kick)
- Tampa Bay – Sedrick Robinson 30-yard pass from Brett Dietz (Garrett Rivas kick), 2:59
- Tulsa – Carlese Franklin 13-yard pass from Justin Allgood (Marco Capozzoli kick no good), 0:44
- Tampa Bay – Sedrick Robinson 11-yard pass from Brett Dietz (Garrett Rivas kick), 0:06

3rd quarter

- Tampa Bay – Tyrone Timmons 6-yard pass from Brett Dietz (Garrett Rivas kick no good), 9:41
- Tulsa – Donovan Morgan 10-yard pass from Justin Allgood (Marco Capozzoli kick), 5:55
- Tampa Bay – Tyrone Timmons 7-yard pass from Brett Dietz (Garrett Rivas kick), 4:47
- Tampa Bay – Eric Ortiz 2-yard run (Garrett Rivas kick), 2:01

4th quarter

- Tampa Bay – DeAndrew Rubin 38-yard pass from Brett Dietz (Garrett Rivas kick), 12:29
- Tulsa – Jeff Hughley 12-yard pass from Justin Allgood (Donovan Morgan pass no good), 7:01
- Tampa Bay – Eric Ortiz 50-yard kickoff return (Garrett Rivas kick), 6:12
- Tulsa – Donovan Morgan 6-yard pass from Justin Allgood (Jeff Hughley pass no good), 3:43

Passing

- Tampa Bay – Brett Dietz: 22/29, 263 yards, 7 TD
- Tulsa – Justin Allgood: 20/43, 242 yards, 6 TD, 3 INT

Rushing

- Tampa Bay – Eric Ortiz: 4 att, 9 yards, 2 TD
- Tulsa – Carlese Franklin: 1 att, 25 yards

Receiving

- Tampa Bay – Sedrick Robinson: 7 rec, 87 yards, 2 TD
- Tulsa – Carlese Franklin: 8 rec, 121 yards, 1 TD

=== American Conference Championship: vs. Orlando Predators ===
Quarter	1	2	3	4	Total
Predators	7	14	14	27	62
Storm	14	21	14	14	63

at St. Pete Times Forum, Tampa, Florida

- Date: August 14
- Game time: 7:30 pm EDT
- Game attendance: 10,104
- Referee: Tom McCabe
- Recap

Game information

1st quarter

- Orlando – T.T. Toliver 4-yard pass from Nick Hill (Carlos Martinez kick), 6:32
- Tampa Bay – DeAndrew Rubin 9-yard pass from Brett Dietz (Garrett Rivas kick), 4:16
- Tampa Bay – Terrence Royal 1-yard run (Garrett Rivas kick), 0:00

2nd quarter

- Orlando – T.T. Toliver 34-yard pass from Nick Hill (Carlos Martinez kick), 12:08
- Tampa Bay – DeAndrew Rubin 22-yard pass from Brett Dietz (Garrett Rivas kick), 9:43
- Orlando – Bobby Sippio 6-yard pass from Nick Hill (Carlos Martinez kick), 6:33
- Tampa Bay – Tyrone Timmons 4-yard pass from Brett Dietz (Garrett Rivas kick), 1:00
- Tampa Bay – Hank Edwards 15-yard pass from Brett Dietz (Garrett Rivas kick), 0:15

3rd quarter

- Tampa Bay – Tyrone Timmons 9-yard pass from Brett Dietz (Garrett Rivas kick), 9:43
- Orlando – T.T. Toliver 8-yard pass from Nick Hill (Carlos Martinez kick), 6:45
- Tampa Bay – Robert Powell 18-yard pass from Brett Dietz (Garrett Rivas kick), 2:11
- Orlando – T.T. Toliver 35-yard pass from Nick Hill (Carlos Martinez kick), 0:26

4th quarter

- Orlando – T.T. Toliver 30-yard pass from Nick Hill (Carlos Martinez kick), 13:22
- Tampa Bay – Terrence Royal 1-yard run (Garrett Rivas kick no good), 8:54
- Orlando – Bobby Sippio 4-yard pass from Nick Hill (Carlos Martinez kick), 6:11
- Orlando – T.T. Toliver 7-yard pass from Nick Hill (Carlos Martinez kick), 1:00
- Tampa Bay – Tyrone Timmons 7-yard pass from Brett Dietz (Terrence Royal pass), 0:49
- Orlando – T.T. Toliver 6-yard pass from Nick Hill (Carlos Martinez kick no good), 0:45

Passing

- Orlando – Nick Hill: 21/35, 265 yards, 9 TD
- Tampa Bay – Brett Dietz: 24/46, 260 yards, 7 TD, 2 INT

Rushing

- Orlando – T.T. Toliver: 1 att, 3 yards
- Tampa Bay – Terrence Royal: 7 att, 6 yards, 2 TD

Receiving

- Orlando – T.T. Toliver: 11 rec, 165 yards, 7 TD
- Tampa Bay – DeAndrew Rubin: 10 rec, 116 yards, 2 TD

=== ArenaBowl XXIII: at Spokane Shock ===
Quarter	1	2	3	4	Total
Storm	7	21	7	22	57
Shock	6	28	14	21	69

at Spokane Veterans Memorial Arena, Spokane, Washington

- Date: August 20
- Game time: 8:00 pm EDT
