= 2010 Dallas Vigilantes season =

Arena Football League team season

- Head coach: Rich Ingold (fired May 24); James Fuller (interim)
- Home stadium: American Airlines Center

Results
- Record: 3–13
- Division place: 3rd AC Southwest
- Playoffs: did not qualify

The 2010 Dallas Vigilantes season was the inaugural season for the franchise in the Arena Football League (AFL). With many players of the old Desperados team that put up a 15–1 record in recent years returning, Dallas fans had high hopes for the Vigilantes carrying on with the Desperados' success. However, after a 1–5 start and an altercation with one of his players, head coach Rich Ingold was fired, and replaced by James Fuller for the remainder of the season. Eventually Clint Dolezel was named as head coach for the 2011 season after the Vigilantes went 2–8 in their final ten games to finish the 2010 season 3–13, despite winning their last game of the season on the road, 62–56 against the Bossier–Shreveport Battle Wings. Two of Dallas's three wins that season came on the road.

In the long run, the Vigilantes finished second-to-last in points per game with 50, only more than the Utah Blaze, who averaged 46.4 points a game. Dallas also shot themselves in the foot with 150 penalties, fifth most in the league behind the Milwaukee Iron, (193) Tampa Bay Storm, (186)Oklahoma City Yard Dawgz, (168) and Orlando Predators. (164) The defense gave up the third most in the league at 57.5 points a game, better than only Bossier-Shreveport and Utah.

The team was coached by Rich Ingold for the first six games before being fired on May 24. Defensive coordinator James Fuller was promoted to interim head coach. The Vigilantes will play their home games at American Airlines Center. The Vigilantes missed the playoffs after finishing with a 3–13 record and placing 7th in the American Conference.

== Standings ==
Southwest Division
Team	W	L	PCT	PF	PA	DIV	CON	Home	Away
y-Tulsa Talons	10	6	.625	994	899	6–0	9–2	6–2	4–4
Oklahoma City Yard Dawgz	6	10	.375	833	870	3–3	4–6	5–3	1–7
Dallas Vigilantes	3	13	.187	800	920	2–4	2–9	1–7	2–6
Bossier–Shreveport Battle Wings	3	13	.187	799	1030	1–5	3–9	2–6	1–7

y - Clinched division

== Regular season schedule ==
The first game in franchise history for the Vigilantes was on April 10 during Week 2, on the road against the Talons. Their first home game will not be until Week 5 against the Yard Dawgz. The last game of the regular season saw the team visit the Battle Wings on July 31.

Week	Day	Date	Kickoff	Opponent	Results		Location	Report
Week	Day	Date	Kickoff	Opponent	Score	Record	Location	Report
1	Bye							
2	Saturday	April 10	8:00 pm	at Tulsa Talons	L 59–63	0–1	BOK Center	
3	Friday	April 16	7:30 pm	at Tampa Bay Storm	L 41–54	0–2	St. Pete Times Forum	
4	Bye							
5	Friday	April 30	8:30 pm	Oklahoma City Yard Dawgz	W 55–34	1–2	American Airlines Center	
6	Friday	May 7	8:30 pm	Orlando Predators	L 59–70	1–3	American Airlines Center	
7	Friday	May 14	7:35 pm	at Jacksonville Sharks	L 49–70	1–4	Jacksonville Veterans Memorial Arena	
8	Saturday	May 22	8:30 pm	Chicago Rush	L 56–63	1–5	American Airlines Center	
9	Saturday	May 29	8:00 pm	at Milwaukee Iron	L 38–63	1–6	Bradley Center	
10	Friday	June 4	8:30 pm	Bossier–Shreveport Battle Wings	L 69–70	1–7	American Airlines Center	
11	Friday	June 11	8:00 pm	Tulsa Talons	L 51–69	1–8	American Airlines Center	
12	Saturday	June 19	8:30 pm	at Alabama Vipers	L 52–55	1–9	Von Braun Center	
13	Saturday	June 26	8:05 pm	at Oklahoma City Yard Dawgz	L 31–35	1–10	Cox Convention Center	
14	Friday	July 2	8:30 pm	Iowa Barnstormers	L 38–59	1–11	Wells Fargo Arena	
15	Friday	July 9	8:00 pm	Tampa Bay Storm	L 34–56	1–12	American Airlines Center	
16	Saturday	July 17	8:00 pm	at Chicago Rush	W 65–52 (OT)	2–12	Allstate Arena	
17	Friday	July 23	8:30 pm	Utah Blaze	L 41–51	2–13	American Airlines Center	
18	Saturday	July 31	8:05 pm	Bossier–Shreveport Battle Wings	W 62–56	3–13	CenturyTel Center	

All times are EDT

== Roster ==
2010 Dallas Vigilantes roster
Quarterbacks: 12 Collin Drafts; 5 Dan Raudabaugh; Fullbacks: Currently vacant; Wide receivers: 1 Larry Brackins; 82 John Fields; 3 Kenny Henderson; 8 Derek Lee; -- Will Pettis	Offensive linemen: -- Phil Bogle; -- Adrian Gonzalez; -- Ryan Roget; 95 Tommy Taggart; -- Tony Washington; Defensive linemen: -- David Hicks; -- John Nix; -- Gabe Nyenhuis; -- Duke Pettijohn	Linebackers: 10 Justin Warren; Defensive backs: -- Jason Harmon; -- Reggie Lewis; -- Delenell Reid; -- Clarence Ward; Kickers: 18 Mark Lewis	Injury reserve: -- Chris Brown DB; -- Thomas Crowley OL; -- Steve Gonzalez WR/DB; -- B. J. Hall QB; -- Danny Howard WR; -- Troy Mason WR; 6 Eddie Moten DB; -- Vanalt Nelson OL; -- Ty Nsekhe DL; 14 Shane Stafford QB; -- Gillis Wilson DL; Other league exempt: -- Michael Landry DL; Refused to report: -- Tony McLain OL; -- Robert Pollard DL; Team suspension: -- Jamrgus O'Neal DB; Recallable reassignment: 40 John White FB; Rookies in italics Roster updated July 15, 2010; 22 Active, 16 Inactive

== Regular season ==
=== Week 2: at Tulsa Talons ===
Quarter	1	2	3	4	Total
Vigilantes	14	17	14	14	59
Talons	7	14	20	22	63

at BOK Center, Tulsa, Oklahoma

- Date: April 10
- Game time: 8:00 pm EDT
- Game attendance: 6,108
- Referee: Joe Pester
- Recap

Game information

1st quarter

- Dallas – Josh White 1-yard run (Mark Lewis kick), 5:30
- Tulsa – Jamar Watson 2-yard pass from Justin Allgood (Tony Dodson kick), 2:41
- Dallas – Kenny Henderson 6-yard pass from Shane Stafford (Mark Lewis kick), 0:00

2nd quarter

- Dallas – Josh White 1-yard run (Mark Lewis kick), 9:34
- Tulsa – Jeff Hughley 2-yard run (Tony Dodson kick), 7:00
- Dallas – Larry Brackins 2-yard pass from Shane Stafford (Mark Lewis kick), 1:18
- Tulsa – Donovan Morgan 45-yard pass from Justin Allgood (Tony Dodson kick), 0:54
- Dallas – Mark Lewis 11-yard field goal, 0:00

3rd quarter

- Dallas – Kenny Henderson 3-yard pass from Shane Stafford (Mark Lewis kick), 11:40
- Tulsa – Donovan Morgan 32-yard pass from Justin Allgood (Tony Dodson kick), 9:51
- Dallas – Kenny Henderson 22-yard pass from Shane Stafford (Mark Lewis kick), 8:42
- Dallas – Donovan Morgan 23-yard pass from Justin Allgood (Tony Dodson kick no good), 6:09
- Tulsa – John Scott 19-yard fumble return (Tony Dodson kick), 1:52

4th quarter

- Dallas – Josh White 3-yard run (Mark Lewis kick), 11:23
- Tulsa – Jeff Hughley 10-yard pass from Justin Allgood (Tony Dodson kick), 10:17
- Dallas – Derek Lee 20-yard pass from Shane Stafford (Mark Lewis kick), 6:33
- Tulsa – Justin Allgood 2-yard run (Donovan Morgan pass), 2:35
- Tulsa – Justin Allgood 1-yard run (Tony Dodson kick), 0:22

Passing

- Dallas – Shane Stafford: 31/47, 374 yards, 5 TD
- Tulsa – Justin Allgood: 10/23, 182 yards, 5 TD, 1 INT

Rushing

- Dallas – Josh White: 9 att, 33 yards, 3 TD
- Tulsa – Justin Allgood: 3 att, 3 yards, 2 TD

Receiving

- Dallas – Derek Lee: 12 rec, 151 yards, 1 TD
- Tulsa – Donovan Morgan: 4 rec, 112 yards, 3 TD

After a 20-yard touchdown reception by Derek Lee, the Vigilantes had an 11-point lead with 6:33 left in the 4th quarter. However, the Talons fought back with a pair of short touchdown runs by their quarterback, Justin Allgood, the second of which set up by a fumble recovery by Tulsa's Jamar Ransom at the Dallas 2-yard line. The Vigilantes' final drive fell short of a touchdown, resulting in a loss. Quarterback Shane Stafford threw for 347 yards and 5 touchdowns, while Josh White ran for 33 yards and 3 touchdowns in the losing effort.

=== Week 3: at Tampa Bay Storm ===
Quarter	1	2	3	4	Total
Vigilantes	14	7	7	13	41
Storm	7	20	6	21	54

at St. Pete Times Forum, Tampa, Florida

- Date: April 16
- Game time: 7:30 pm EDT
- Game attendance: 14,122
- Referee: Kevin Stine
- Recap

Game information

1st quarter

- Dallas – Kenny Henderson 52-yard kickoff return (Mark Lewis kick), 14:01
- Tampa Bay – Cleannord Saintil 3-yard run (Garrett Rivas kick), 8:44
- Dallas – Derek Lee 9-yard pass from Collin Drafts (Mark Lewis kick), 3:41

2nd quarter

- Tampa Bay – Cleannord Saintil 3-yard run (Garrett Rivas kick no good), 10:16
- Dallas – Kenny Henderson 29-yard pass from Collin Drafts (Mark Lewis kick), 7:36
- Tampa Bay – Tyrone Timmons 13-yard pass from Brett Dietz (Garrett Rivas kick), 5:16
- Tampa Bay – Tyrone Timmons 8-yard pass from Brett Dietz (Garrett Rivas kick), 0:15

3rd quarter

- Dallas – Collin Drafts 15-yard run (Mark Lewis kick), 6:43
- Tampa Bay – Hank Edwards 44-yard pass from Brett Dietz (Garrett Rivas kick no good), 4:36

4th quarter

- Tampa Bay – Tyrone Timmons 8-yard pass from Brett Dietz (Garrett Rivas kick), 14:08
- Dallas – Derek Lee 34-yard pass from Collin Drafts (Mark Lewis kick), 12:36
- Tampa Bay – Cleannord Saintil 20-yard pass from Brett Dietz (Garrett Rivas kick), 10:54
- Tampa Bay – Tyrone Timmons 5-yard pass from Brett Dietz (Garrett Rivas kick), 2:15
- Dallas – Kenny Henderson 9-yard pass from Collin Drafts (Collin Drafts pass no good), 0:19

Passing

- Dallas – Collin Drafts: 21/30, 212 yards, 4 TD, 1 INT
- Tampa Bay – Brett Dietz: 30/45, 320 yards, 6 TD

Rushing

- Dallas – Collin Drafts: 3 att, 27 yards, 1 TD
- Tampa Bay – Cleannord Saintil: 2 att, 6 yards, 2 TD

Receiving

- Dallas – Derek Lee: 6 rec, 88 yards, 2 TD
- Tampa Bay – Tyrone Timmons: 11 rec, 108 yards, 4 TD

Dallas got off to a quick start by returning the opening kickoff for a touchdown. Having lost starting quarterback Shane Stafford to injury, Collin Drafts was called on to take his place. Drafts completed 21 of 30 passes for 212 yards, and had 5 total touchdowns on the day, but a key play with under a minute left in the 1st half shifted the momentum in the game to Tampa Bay. It was 4th and goal on the 1-yard line for the Vigilantes, but they were unable to take the ball in for a score, turning the ball over on downs. Now with possession, the Storm took the ball the length of the field for a touchdown. Instead of increasing their lead before the half, the Vigilantes now trailed. Drafts had a 15-yard rushing touchdown midway through the 3rd quarter to regain the lead, but the Dallas defense allowed Tampa Bay to take it right back, and Dallas never led the rest of the night. The loss dropped the Vigilantes to 0–2.

=== Week 5: vs. Oklahoma City Yard Dawgz ===
Quarter	1	2	3	4	Total
Yard Dawgz	0	21	7	6	34
Vigilantes	20	21	7	7	55

at American Airlines Center, Dallas, Texas

- Date: April 30
- Game time: 8:30 pm EDT
- Game attendance: 7,051
- Referee: Mark Windham
- Recap

Game information

1st quarter

- Dallas – Larry Brackins 9-yard pass from Collin Drafts (Mark Lewis kick no good), 12:00
- Dallas – Josh White 4-yard run (Mark Lewis kick), 4:58
- Dallas – Kenny Henderson field goal return (Mark Lewis kick), 1:31

2nd quarter

- Oklahoma City – Timon Marshall 9-yard pass from Tommy Grady (A.J. Haglund kick), 9:10
- Oklahoma City – Timon Marshall 21-yard pass from Tommy Grady (A.J. Haglund kick), 5:07
- Oklahoma City – Aaron Chavers 38-yard fumble return (A.J. Haglund kick), 2:41
- Dallas – Derek Lee 13-yard pass from Collin Drafts (Mark Lewis kick), 0:49
- Dallas – Chris Brown 23-yard interception return (Mark Lewis kick)
- Dallas – Larry Brackins 25-yard pass from Collin Drafts (Mark Lewis kick), 0:02

3rd quarter

- Dallas – Derek Lee 8-yard pass from Collin Drafts (Mark Lewis kick), 9:54
- Oklahoma City – Timon Marshall 18-yard pass from Tommy Grady (AJ Haglund kick), 3:24

4th quarter

- Dallas – Collin Drafts 1-yard run (Mark Lewis kick), 11:41
- Oklahoma City – Anthony Hines 16-yard pass from Tommy Grady (Chad Cook run no good), 0:01
- Oklahoma City – Tommy Grady: 22/41, 205 yards, 4 TD, 1 INT
- Dallas – Collin Drafts: 18/35, 239 yards, 4 TD

Rushing

- Oklahoma City – Chad Cook: 2 att, 2 yards
- Dallas – Collin Drafts: 3 att, 3 yards, 1 TD

Receiving

- Oklahoma City – Timon Marshall: 9 rec, 88 yards, 3 TD
- Dallas – Larry Brackins: 7 rec, 111 yards, 2 TD

The Vigilantes won their first game in franchise history by defeating the Yard Dawgz 55–34. Dallas had a 20–0 lead after the 1st quarter. Oklahoma City scored the first three touchdowns on the 2nd quarter to take a 21–20 lead, but Dallas came up with three touchdowns of their own in the final minute of the half on a pair of passing touchdowns and an interception that was returned for a touchdown. The rest of the game did not see much scoring by either team, allowing Dallas to cruise to a victory.

Collin Drafts threw for 239 yards and 4 touchdowns, and also had a rushing touchdown. Larry Brackins was the leading receiver with 111 yards on 7 catches and 2 touchdowns.

=== Week 6: vs. Orlando Predators ===
Quarter	1	2	3	4	Total
Predators	10	13	21	26	70
Vigilantes	7	25	21	6	59

at American Airlines Center, Dallas, Texas

- Date: May 7
- Game time: 8:30 pm EDT
- Game attendance: 7,108
- Recap

Game information

1st quarter

- Dallas – Josh White 1-yard run (Mark Lewis kick good), 11:24
- Orlando – Carlos Martinez 39-yard field goal, 6:01
- Orlando – James Lynch 1-yard run (Carlos Martinez kick good), 3:02

2nd quarter

- Dallas – Josh White 1-yard run (Mark Lewis kick good), 13:00
- Orlando – Derrick Lewis 32-yard pass from Nick Hill (Carlos Martinez kick good), 10:16
- Dallas – Larry Brackins 18-yard pass from Collin Drafts (Mark Lewis kick good), 7:13
- Dallas – Safety, 5:11
- Dallas – Kenny Henderson 34-yard pass from Collin Drafts (Mark Lewis kick good), 3:59
- Orlando – James Lynch 1-yard run (Carlos Martinez run no good), 0:00
- Dallas – Fumbled PAT return, 0:00

3rd quarter

- Orlando – T.T. Toliver 24-yard pass from Nick Hill (Carlos Martinez kick good), 13:47
- Dallas – Larry Brackins 11-yard pass from Collin Drafts (Mark Lewis kick good), 8:47
- Orlando – T.T. Toliver 42-yard pass from Nick Hill (Carlos Martinez kick good), 7:27
- Dallas – Derek Lee 33-yard pass from Collin Drafts (Mark Lewis kick good), 6:29
- Orlando – Joshua Bush 6-yard pass from Nick Hill (Carlos Martinez kick good), 1:03
- Dallas – Derek Lee 44-yard pass from Collin Drafts (Mark Lewis kick good), 0:00

4th quarter

- Orlando – T.T. Toliver 14-yard pass from Nick Hill (Carlos Martinez kick no good), 12:04
- Orlando – Derrick Lewis 30-yard pass from Nick Hill (Carlos Martinez kick good), 8:05
- Orlando – T.T. Toliver 12-yard run (Carlos Martinez kick good), 3:45
- Dallas – Larry Brackins 14-yard pass from Collin Drafts (Collin Drafts pass no good), 0:55
- Orlando – Jerrian James 8-yard fumble return (Carlos Martinez kick no good), 0:00

Passing

- Orlando – Nick Hill: 21/29, 297 yards, 6 TD, 1 INT
- Dallas – Collin Drafts: 17/29, 283 yards, 6 TD, 3 INT

Rushing

- Orlando – Joshua Bush: 1 att, 25 yards
- Dallas – Kirby Griffin: 3 att, 5 yards, 2 TD

Receiving

- Orlando – T.T. Toliver: 10 rec, 149 yards, 3 TD
- Dallas – Derek Lee: 6 rec, 123 yards, 2 TD

After taking a 63–44 lead after 3 quarters, the Orlando Predators took advantage of turnovers on Dallas, which cost Dallas the game. Collin Drafts threw 6 touchdowns but had 3 interceptions, all in the 4th quarter. Drafts also fumbled a snap late in the game, which was picked up by Orlando at the Dallas 8-yard line and taken in for a touchdown.

=== Week 7: at Jacksonville Sharks ===
Quarter	1	2	3	4	Total
Vigilantes	0	14	21	14	49
Sharks	13	23	7	27	70

at Jacksonville Veterans Memorial Arena, Jacksonville, Florida

- Date: May 14
- Game time: 7:35 pm EDT
- Game attendance: 10,052
- Recap

Game information

1st quarter

- Jacksonville – Dallas Baker 19-yard pass from Aaron Garcia (Mossimo Sbaccia kick)
- Jacksonville – Jomo Wilson 1-yard pass from Aaron Garcia (Mossimo Sbaccia kick no good)

2nd quarter

- Dallas – Josh White 12-yard pass from Collin Drafts (Mark Lewis kick)
- Jacksonville – Jomo Wilson 11-yard pass from Aaron Garcia (Mossimo Sbaccia kick)
- Jacksonville – Jeron Harvey 16-yard pass from Aaron Garcia (Mossimo Sbaccia kick)
- Jacksonville – Safety, 1:12
- Jacksonville – Jeron Harvey 15-yard pass from Aaron Garcia (Mossimo Sbaccia kick), 0:27
- Dallas – Larry Brackins 19-yard pass from Collin Drafts (Mark Lewis kick), 0:16

3rd quarter

- Dallas – Larry Brackins 5-yard pass from Collin Drafts (Mark Lewis kick), 12:07
- Dallas – Larry Brackins 22-yard pass from Collin Drafts (Mark Lewis kick), 6:00
- Jacksonville – Jomo Wilson 33-yard pass from Aaron Garcia (Mossimo Sbaccia kick), 4:34
- Dallas – Kenny Henderson 40-yard pass from Collin Drafts (Mark Lewis kick), 1:18

4th quarter

- Jacksonville – Jomo Wilson 22-yard pass from Aaron Garcia (Mossimo Sbaccia kick no good), 14:10
- Dallas – Larry Brackins 7-yard pass from Collin Drafts (Mark Lewis kick no good), 7:35
- Jacksonville – Dallas Baker 14-yard pass from Aaron Garcia (Mossimo Sbaccia kick), 6:37
- Jacksonville – Justin Parrish 1-yard fumble return (Mossimo Sbaccia kick), 5:32
- Dallas – Larry Brackins 13-yard pass from Collin Drafts (Kenny Henderson run), 1:15
- Jacksonville – Kirby Griffin 4-yard run (Mossimo Sbaccia kick), 0:25
- Dallas – Collin Drafts: 25/39, 308 yards, 7 TD, 1 INT
- Jacksonville – Aaron Garcia: 31/47, 318 yards, 8 TD

Rushing

- Dallas – Josh White: 4 att, 3 yards
- Jacksonville – Kirby Griffin: 4 att, 6 yards, 1 TD

Receiving

- Dallas – Larry Brackins: 12 rec, 119 yards, 5 TD
- Jacksonville – Jomo Wilson: 10 rec, 123 yards, 2 TD

The Vigilantes fell behind 36–7 late in the 1st half. Scoring the game's next 3 touchdowns, they made it an 8-point game, and by the end of the 3rd quarter trailed 43–35. After the teams traded the first two touchdowns of the 4th quarter, Jacksonville took a 14-point lead on a fumble by Collin Drafts a yard out of his own end zone that was picked up by the Sharks and taken in for the score. Dallas ran out of time for a comeback, falling 70–49.

Drafts threw for 308 yards and 7 touchdowns with an interception. In all, Dallas had 4 turnovers in the game. Larry Brackins caught 12 passes, 5 for touchdowns, with 119 total receiving yards.

=== Week 8: vs. Chicago Rush ===
Quarter	1	2	3	4	Total
Rush	21	20	7	15	63
Vigilantes	14	21	7	14	56

at American Airlines Center, Dallas, Texas

- Date: May 22
- Game time: 8:30 pm EDT
- Game attendance: 4,583
- Referee: Mark Windham
- Recap

Following another loss, head coach Rich Ingold was fired. Defensive coordinator James Fuller was promoted to interim head coach.

=== Week 9: at Milwaukee Iron ===
Quarter	1	2	3	4	Total
Vigilantes	7	10	7	14	38
Iron	13	14	16	20	63

at Bradley Center, Milwaukee, Wisconsin

- Date: May 29
- Game time: 8:00 pm EDT
- Referee: Bob McElwee
- Recap

Game information

1st quarter

- Milwaukee – Anthony Jones 7-yard pass from Chris Greisen (Robert Forstrom kick), 9:26
- Dallas – Derek Lee 3-yard pass from Collin Drafts (Mark Lewis kick), 6:59
- Milwaukee – Nate Forse 14-yard pass from Chris Greisen (Robert Forstrom kick blocked), 2:53

2nd quarter

- Milwaukee – Antoine Burns 17-yard pass from Chris Greisen (Robert Forstrom kick), 12:19
- Dallas – Kenny Henderson 8-yard pass from Collin Drafts (Mark Lewis kick), 9:58
- Dallas – Mark Lewis 12-yard field goal, 2:41
- Milwaukee – Tyre Young 7-yard run (Robert Forstrom kick), 0:27

3rd quarter

- Dallas – Kenny Henderson 5-yard pass from Collin Drafts (Mark Lewis kick), 11:16
- Milwaukee – Antoine Burns 29-yard pass from Chris Greisen (Robert Forstrom kick), 8:35
- Milwaukee – Safety, 7:47
- Milwaukee – Chris Greisen 1-yard run (Robert Forstrom kick), 2:52

4th quarter

- Dallas – Kenny Henderson 4-yard run (Mark Lewis kick), 14:21
- Milwaukee – Tyre Young 6-yard run (Robert Forstrom kick no good), 11:59
- Dallas – Kenny Henderson 1-yard run (Mark Lewis kick), 7:17
- Milwaukee – Nate Forse 8-yard pass from Chris Greisen (Robert Forstrom kick), 5:22
- Milwaukee – Antoine Burns 28-yard pass from Chris Greisen (Robert Forstrom kick), 0:32

Passing

- Dallas – Collin Drafts: 24/43, 237 yards, 3 TD
- Milwaukee – Chris Greisen: 23/36, 295 yards, 6 TD

Rushing

- Dallas – Collin Drafts: 4 att, 14 yards
- Milwaukee – Tyre Young: 4 att, 12 yards, 2 TD

Receiving

- Dallas – Matt Fields: 12 rec, 128 yards
- Milwaukee – Antoine Burns: 8 rec, 121 yards, 3 TD

=== Week 10: vs. Bossier–Shreveport Battle Wings ===
Quarter	1	2	3	4	Total
Battle Wings	21	13	14	22	70
Vigilantes	7	20	28	14	69

at American Airlines Center, Dallas, Texas

- Date: June 4
- Game time: 8:30 pm EDT
- Game attendance: 4,297
- Referee: Mark Windham
- Recap

Game information

1st quarter

- Bossier–Shreveport – Gus Tyson 3-yard run (Nick Gatto kick), 10:55
- Dallas – Derek Lee 18-yard pass from Collin Drafts (Mark Lewis kick), 5:35
- Bossier–Shreveport – Randy Hymes 19-yard pass from Gary Cooper (Nick Gatto kick), 1:29
- Bossier–Shreveport – Willis Marshall 22-yard interception return (Nick Gatto kick), 0:00

2nd quarters

- Dallas – Derek Lee 9-yard pass from Collin Drafts (Mark Lewis kick), 12:36
- Bossier–Shreveport – James Jordan 9-yard pass from Gary Cooper (Nick Gatto kick), 7:41
- Dallas – Collin Drafts 9-yard run (Mark Lewis kick), 4:08
- Dallas – Kenny Henderson 24-yard pass from Collin Drafts (Mark Lewis kick no good), 0:12
- Bossier–Shreveport – Randy Hymes 19-yard pass from Gary Cooper (Nick Gatto run no good), 0:00

3rd quarter

- Dallas – Kenny Henderson 7-yard pass from Collin Drafts (Mark Lewis kick), 13:55
- Bossier–Shreveport – P.J. Berry 19-yard pass from Gary Cooper (Nick Gatto kick), 11:29
- Dallas – Matt Fields 9-yard pass from Collin Drafts (Mark Lewis kick), 7:57
- Bossier–Shreveport – James Jordan 4-yard pass from Gary Cooper (Nick Gatto kick), 4:18
- Dallas – Matt Fields 9-yard pass from Collin Drafts (Mark Lewis kick), 2:08
- Dallas – Derek Lee 13-yard pass from Collin Drafts (Mark Lewis kick), 0:01

4th quarter

- Bossier–Shreveport – P.J. Berry 18-yard pass from Gary Cooper (Nick Gatto kick), 12:06
- Dallas – Matt Fields 22-yard pass from Collin Drafts (Mark Lewis kick), 9:23
- Dallas – Duke Pettijohn 14-yard fumble return (Mark Lewis kick), 6:51
- Bossier–Shreveport – Gary Cooper 1-yard run (Nick Gatto kick), 5:13
- Bossier–Shreveport – James Jordan 5-yard pass from Gary Cooper (James Jordan pass), 0:00

Passing

- Bossier–Shreveport – Gary Cooper: 32/41, 313 yards, 7 TD
- Dallas – Collin Drafts: 17/26, 191 yards, 8 TD, 1 INT

Rushing

- Bossier–Shreveport – Gus Tyson: 4 att, 13 yards, 1 TD
- Dallas – Josh White: 1 att, 20 yards

Receiving

- Bossier–Shreveport – Randy Hymes: 7 rec, 93 yards, 2 TD
- Dallas – Kenny Henderson: 7 rec, 74 yards, 2 TD

=== Week 11: vs. Tulsa Talons ===
Quarter	1	2	3	4	Total
Talons	7	21	13	28	69
Vigilantes	14	17	13	7	51

at American Airlines Center, Dallas, Texas

- Date: June 11
- Game time: 8:00 pm EDT
- Game attendance: 4,192
- Referee: Mark Windham
- Recap

Game information

1st quarter

- Dallas – Josh White 2-yard run (Mark Lewis kick), 6:51
- Tulsa – Carlese Franklin 8-yard pass from Justin Allgood (Marco Cabozzoli kick), 4:14
- Dallas – Kenny Henderson 18-yard pass from Collin Drafts (Mark Lewis kick), 2:35

2nd quarter

- Dallas – Matt Fields 29-yard pass from Collin Drafts (Mark Lewis kick), 9:03
- Tulsa – Odie Armstrong 2-yard run (Marco Cabozzoli kick), 6:46
- Dallas – Kenny Henderson 24-yard pass from Collin Drafts (Mark Lewis kick), 5:08
- Tulsa – Donovan Morgan 10-yard pass from Justin Allgood (Marco Cabozzoli kick), 0:52
- Dallas – Mark Lewis 20-yard field goal, 0:19
- Tulsa – Donovan Morgan 8-yard pass from Justin Allgood (Marco Cabozzoli kick), 0:14

3rd quarter

- Dallas – Josh White 1-yard run (Mark Lewis kick), 9:09
- Dallas – Larry Brackins 0-yard kickoff return (Mark Lewis kick no good), 8:07
- Tulsa – Jeff Hughley 39-yard pass from Justin Allgood (Carlese Franklin pass no good), 6:55
- Tulsa – Donovan Morgan 14-yard pass from Justin Allgood (Marco Cabozzoli kick), 5:14

4th quarter

- Tulsa – Jeff Hughley 1-yard run (Marco Cabozzoli kick), 12:03
- Dallas – Kenny Henderson 56-yard kickoff return (Mark Lewis kick), 11:16
- Tulsa – Carlese Franklin 7-yard pass from Justin Allgood (Marco Cabozzoli kick), 10:05
- Tulsa – Donovan Morgan 7-yard pass from Justin Allgood (Marco Cabozzoli kick), 3:14
- Tulsa – Donovan Morgan 7-yard pass from Justin Allgood (Marco Cabozzoli kick), 0:35

Passing

- Tulsa – Justin Allgood: 25/37, 384 yards, 8 TD, 1 INT
- Dallas – Collin Drafts: 23/37, 239 yards, 4 TD, 3 INT

Rushing

- Tulsa – Odie Armstrong: 3 att, 19 yards, 1 TD
- Dallas – Josh White: 6 att, 10 yards, 2 TD

Receiving

- Tulsa – Donovan Morgan: 11 rec, 143 yards, 5 TD
- Dallas – Kenny Henderson: 10 rec, 104 yards, 2 TD

=== Week 12: at Alabama Vipers ===
Quarter	1	2	3	4	Total
Vigilantes	14	17	7	14	52
Vipers	20	13	7	15	55

at Von Braun Center, Huntsville, Alabama

- Date: June 19
- Game time: 8:30 pm EDT
- Game attendance: 5,260
- Recap

Game information

1st quarter

- Alabama – Larry Shipp 14-yard pass from Kevin Eakin (Brian Jackson kick), 12:09
- Dallas – Kenny Henderson 12-yard pass from Collin Drafts (Mark Lewis kick), 6:25
- Alabama – Michael Johnson 35-yard pass from Kevin Eakin (Brian Jackson kick), 3:20
- Dallas – Kenny Henderson 26-yard pass from Collin Drafts (Mark Lewis kick), 1:00
- Alabama – C.J. Johnson 56-yard kickoff return (Brian Jackson kick no good), 0:05

2nd quarter

- Dallas – Duke Pettijohn 1-yard run (Mark Lewis kick), 13:29
- Alabama – Larry Shipp 18-yard pass from Kevin Eakin (Brian Jackson kick), 8:23
- Dallas – Mark Lewis 18-yard field goal, 5:42
- Alabama – Michael Johnson 27-yard pass from Kevin Eakin (Brian Jackson kick no good), 2:27
- Dallas – Larry Brackins 7-yard pass from B.J. Hall (Mark Lewis kick), 0:22

3rd quarter

- Alabama – C.J. Johnson 3-yard pass from Kevin Eakin (Brian Jackson kick), 12:39
- Dallas – B.J. Hall 5-yard run (Mark Lewis kick), 4:57

4th quarter

- Dallas – Kenny Henderson 20-yard pass from B.J. Hall (Mark Lewis kick), 13:53
- Alabama – Larry Shipp 14-yard pass from Kevin Eakin (Michael Johnson pass), 9:49

Passing

- Dallas – B.J. Hall: 16/31, 155 yards, 3 TD
- Alabama – Kevin Eakin: 21/31, 264 yards, 7 TD, 1 INT

Rushing

- Dallas – B.J. Hall: 3 att, 42 yards, 1 TD
- Alabama – Kevin Eakin: 1 att, 5 yards

Receiving

- Dallas – Kenny Henderson: 9 rec, 110 yards, 3 TD
- Alabama – Michael Johnson: 7 rec, 117 yards, 3 TD

=== Week 13: at Oklahoma City Yard Dawgz ===
Quarter	1	2	3	4	Total
Vigilantes	0	17	7	7	31
Yard Dawgz	6	10	0	19	35

at Cox Convention Center, Oklahoma City, Oklahoma

- Date: June 26
- Game time: 8:05 pm EDT
- Game attendance: 5,114
- Referee: Chris Snead
- Recap

Game information

1st quarter

- Oklahoma City – Craig Fulton Jr. 18-yard pass from Tommy Grady (Michael Salerno kick no good), 9:35

2nd quarter

- Dallas – Brandon Pahula 3-yard fumble return (Mark Lewis kick), 13:43
- Dallas – Mark Lewis 15-yard field goal, 7:01
- Oklahoma City – Al Hunt 24-yard pass from Tommy Grady (Michael Salerno kick), 4:29
- Dallas – Matt Fields 26-yard pass from B.J. Hall (Mark Lewis kick), 0:41
- Oklahoma City – Michael Salerno 14-yard field goal, 0:01

3rd quarter

- Dallas – Matt Fields 31-yard pass from B.J. Hall (Mark Lewis kick), 3:23

4th quarter

- Oklahoma City – Xavier Lee 44-yard pass from Tommy Grady (Al Hunt run no good), 9:31
- Dallas – Matt Fields 19-yard pass from B.J. Hall (Mark Lewis kick), 5:29
- Oklahoma City – Chad Cook 1-yard run (Michael Salerno kick), 1:00
- Oklahoma City – Craig Fulton Jr. 24-yard pass from Tommy Grady (Al Hunt pass no good), 0:15

Passing

- Dallas – B.J. Hall: 25/39, 243 yards, 3 TD, 2 INT
- Oklahoma City – Tommy Grady: 26/56, 339 yards, 4 TD, 2 INT

Rushing

- Dallas – Duke Pettijohn: 2 att, 14 yards
- Oklahoma City – Chad Cook: 2 att, 2 yards, 1 TD

Receiving

- Dallas – Matt Fields: 9 rec, 123 yards, 3 TD
- Oklahoma City – Xavier Lee: 9 rec, 143 yards, 1 TD

=== Week 14: vs. Iowa Barnstormers ===
Quarter	1	2	3	4	Total
Barnstormers	7	16	15	21	59
Vigilantes	14	3	7	14	38

at American Airlines Center, Dallas, Texas

- Date: July 2
- Game time: 8:30 pm EDT
- Game attendance: 4,126
- Referee: Mark Windham
- Recap

Game information

1st quarter

- Dallas – Derek Lee 7-yard pass from Collin Drafts (Mark Lewis kick), 12:12
- Iowa – Jesse Schmidt 39-yard pass from Ryan Vena (Jeff Glas kick), 10:56
- Dallas – Collin Drafts 1-yard run (Mark Lewis kick), 5:16

2nd quarter

- Iowa – Safety, 13:58
- Iowa – Jesse Schmidt 33-yard pass from Ryan Vena (Jeff Glas kick), 11:49
- Iowa – Ryan Vena 1-yard run (Jeff Glas kick), 1:27
- Dallas – Mark Lewis 36-yard field goal, 0:00

3rd quarter

- Iowa – Larry Kendrick 55-yard kickoff return (Tanner Varner run), 13:39
- Dallas – Kenny Henderson 4-yard pass from Collin Drafts (Mark Lewis kick), 2:49

4th quarter

- Iowa – Jesse Schmidt 17-yard pass from Ryan Vena (Jeff Glas kick), 12:56
- Dallas – Will Pettis 13-yard pass from Collin Drafts (Mark Lewis kick), 8:16
- Iowa – Ryan Vena 5-yard run (Jeff Glas kick), 7:19
- Iowa – Rodney Filer 1-yard run (Jeff Glas kick), 1:00
- Dallas – Collin Drafts 1-yard run (Mark Lewis kick), 0:09

Passing

- Iowa – Ryan Vena: 16/25, 217 yards, 4 TD, 1 INT
- Dallas – Collin Drafts: 20/40, 220 yards, 3 TD, 2 INT

Rushing

- Iowa – Rodney Filer: 7 att, 27 yards, 1 TD
- Dallas – Duke Pettijohn: 1 att, 2 yards

Receiving

- Iowa – Jesse Schmidt: 7 rec, 127 yards, 3 TD
- Dallas – Kenny Henderson: 5 rec, 79 yards, 1 TD

=== Week 15: vs. Tampa Bay Storm ===
Quarter	1	2	3	4	Total
Storm	7	21	14	14	56
Vigilantes	7	17	10	0	34

at American Airlines Center, Dallas, Texas

- Date: July 9
- Game time: 8:00 pm EDT
- Game attendance: 5,009
- Referee: Mark Windham
- Recap

Game information

1st quarter

- Tampa Bay – Sedrick Robinson 30-yard pass from Brett Dietz (Garrett Rivas kick), 10:21
- Dallas – Matt Fields 18-yard pass from Collin Drafts (Mark Lewis kick), 0:15

2nd quarter

- Tampa Bay – Hank Edwards 7-yard pass from Brett Dietz (Garrett Rivas kick), 10:36
- Dallas – Derek Lee 14-yard pass from Collin Drafts (Mark Lewis kick), 6:43
- Tampa Bay – Tyrone Timmons 9-yard pass from Brett Dietz (Garrett Rivas kick), 3:22
- Dallas – Derek Lee 20-yard pass from Collin Drafts (Mark Lewis kick), 0:21
- Tampa Bay – Sedrick Robinson 36-yard pass from Brett Dietz (Garrett Rivas kick), 0:06
- Dallas – Mark Lewis 29-yard field goal, 0:00

3rd quarter

- Dallas – Matt Fields 19-yard pass from Collin Drafts (Mark Lewis kick), 10:41
- Tampa Bay – Tyrone Timmons 21-yard pass from Brett Dietz (Garrett Rivas kick), 7:26
- Tampa Bay – Cliff Dukes 10-yard fumble return (Garrett Rivas kick), 5:09
- Dallas – Mark Lewis 15-yard field goal, 0:37

4th quarter

- Tampa Bay – Hank Edwards 28-yard pass from Brett Dietz (Garrett Rivas kick), 5:22
- Tampa Bay – Terrence Royal 3-yard run (Garrett Rivas kick), 0:00

Passing

- Tampa Bay – Brett Dietz: 20/31, 329 yards, 6 TD, 2 INT
- Dallas – Collin Drafts: 25/42, 228 yards, 4 TD

Rushing

- Tampa Bay – Terrence Royal: 5 att, 10 yards, 1 TD
- Dallas – Duke Pettijohn: 2 att, 5 yards

Receiving

- Tampa Bay – Hank Edwards: 7 rec, 133 yards, 2 TD
- Dallas – Derek Lee: 8 rec, 99 yards, 2 TD

=== Week 16: at Chicago Rush ===
Quarter	1	2	3	4	OT	Total
Vigilantes	14	14	7	17	13	65
Rush	0	23	14	15	0	52

at Allstate Arena, Rosemont, Illinois

- Date: July 17
- Game time: 8:00 pm EDT
- Game attendance: 7,594
- Referee: Tom McCabe
- Recap

Game information

1st quarter

- Dallas – Kenny Henderson 24-yard pass from Collin Drafts (Mark Lewis kick), 13:04
- Dallas – Matt Fields 20-yard pass from Collin Drafts (Mark Lewis kick), 3:37

2nd quarter

- Chicago – Syvelle Newton 9-yard pass from Russ Michna (Chris Gould kick), 13:24
- Dallas – Kenny Henderson 9-yard pass from Collin Drafts (Mark Lewis kick), 9:36
- Chicago – DeJuan Alfonzo 4-yard pass from Russ Michna (Chris Gould kick), 6:33
- Dallas – Collin Drafts 2-yard run (Mark Lewis kick), 1:00
- Chicago – DeJuan Alfonzo 13-yard run (Chris Gould kick), 0:43
- Chicago – Safety, 0:38

3rd quarter

- Chicago – Palauni Ma Sun 7-yard pass from J.J. Raterink (Chris Gould kick), 11:41
- Chicago – Syvelle Newton 10-yard pass from J.J. Raterink (Chris Gould kick), 4:15
- Dallas – Larry Brackins 4-yard pass from Collin Drafts (Mark Lewis kick), 0:00

4th quarter

- Chicago – DeJuan Alfonzo 6-yard pass from J.J. Raterink (Chris Gould kick), 11:01
- Dallas – Larry Brackins 14-yard pass from Collin Drafts (Mark Lewis kick), 4:24
- Dallas – Jason Harmon 2-yard fumble return, 4:24
- Chicago – J.J. Raterink 1-yard run (DeJuan Alfonzo run), 0:41
- Dallas – Mark Lewis 19-yard field goal, 0:00

Overtime

- Dallas – Larry Brackins 4-yard pass from Collin Drafts (Mark Lewis kick), 10:02
- Dallas – Delenall Reid 50-yard interception return

Passing

- Dallas – Collin Drafts: 30/45, 302 yards, 6 TD
- Chicago – J.J. Raterink: 13/19, 156 yards, 3 TD, 1 INT

Rushing

- Dallas – Collin Drafts: 3 att, 11 yards, 1 TD
- Chicago – DeJuan Alfonzo: 2 att, 16 yards, 1 TD

Receiving

- Dallas – Kenny Henderson: 10 rec, 110 yards, 2 TD
- Chicago – Syvelle Newton: 11 rec, 151 yards, 1 TD

=== Week 17: vs. Utah Blaze ===
Quarter	1	2	3	4	Total
Blaze	14	20	7	10	51
Vigilantes	13	14	14	0	41

at American Airlines Center, Dallas, Texas

- Date: July 23
- Game time: 7:30 pm EDT
- Game attendance: 9,123
- Referee: Mark Windham
- Recap

Game information

1st quarter

- Dallas – Derek Lee 20-yard pass from Collin Drafts (Mark Lewis kick no good), 12:21
- Utah – Aaron Boone 3-yard pass from Mark Thorson (Ben Scott kick), 7:02
- Dallas – Derek Lee 13-yard pass from Collin Drafts (Mark Lewis kick), 5:32
- Utah – Aaron Boone 14-yard pass from Mark Thorson (Ben Scott kick), 1:27

2nd quarter

- Dallas – Larry Brackins 7-yard pass from Collin Drafts (Mark Lewis kick), 14:19
- Utah – Aaron Boone 2-yard pass from Mark Thorson (Ben Scott kick no good), 8:43
- Dallas – Larry Brackins 4-yard pass from Collin Drafts (Mark Lewis kick), 3:35
- Utah – Wendall Williams 14-yard pass from Mark Thorson (Ben Scott kick), 2:29
- Utah – Aaron Boone 3-yard pass from Mark Thorson (Ben Scott kick), 0:14

3rd quarter

- Utah – Damian Walker 5-yard pass from Mark Thorson (Ben Scott kick), 8:48
- Dallas – Larry Brackins 21-yard pass from Daniel Raudabaugh (Mark Lewis kick), 5:56
- Dallas – Derek Lee 15-yard pass from Daniel Raudabaugh (Mark Lewis kick), 1:26

4th quarter

- Utah – Aaron Boone 5-yard pass from Brett Elliott (Ben Scott kick), 5:09
- Utah – Ben Scott 9-yard field goal, 0:31

Passing

- Utah – Mark Thorson: 22/38, 145 yards, 2 TD, 2 INT
- Dallas – Daniel Raudabaugh: 9/17, 131 yards, 2 TD

Rushing

- Utah – Damian Walker: 5 att, 3 yards
- Dallas – Tommy Taggart: 1 att, 5 yards

Receiving

- Utah – Wendall Williams: 10 rec, 137 yards, 1 TD
- Dallas – Larry Brackins: 9 rec, 98 yards, 3 TD

=== Week 18: at Bossier–Shreveport Battle Wings ===
Quarter	1	2	3	4	Total
Vigilantes	7	7	21	27	62
Battle Wings	14	14	7	21	56

at CenturyTel Center, Bossier City, Louisiana

- Date: July 31
- Game time: 8:05 pm EDT
- Game attendance: 4,417
- Referee: Scott Vaughn
- Recap

Game information

1st quarter

- Bossier–Shreveport – James Jordan 14-yard pass from Kinsmon Lancaster (Nick Gatto kick), 11:52
- Bossier–Shreveport – James Jordan 3-yard pass from Kinsmon Lancaster (Nick Gatto kick), 6:53
- Dallas – Matt Fields 14-yard pass from Daniel Raudabaugh (Mark Lewis kick), 5:12

2nd quarter

- Bossier–Shreveport – Jason Schule 3-yard run (Nick Gatto kick), 9:45
- Dallas – Larry Brackins 5-yard pass from Daniel Raudabaugh (Mark Lewis kick), 0:59
- Bossier–Shreveport – James Jordan 19-yard pass from Kinsmon Lancaster (Nick Gatto kick), 0:05

3rd quarter

- Dallas – Derek Lee 37-yard pass from Daniel Raudabaugh (Mark Lewis kick), 11:43
- Dallas – Derek Lee 20-yard pass from Daniel Raudabaugh (Mark Lewis kick), 7:31
- Bossier–Shreveport – Kinsmon Lancaster 5-yard run (Nick Gatto kick), 3:19
- Dallas – Kenny Henderson 44-yard pass from Daniel Raudabaugh (Mark Lewis kick), 0:05

4th quarter

- Dallas – Derek Lee 10-yard interception return (Mark Lewis kick), 13:37
- Dallas – Derek Lee 24-yard pass from Daniel Raudabaugh (Mark Lewis kick), 9:24
- Bossier–Shreveport – P.J. Berry 6-yard pass from Kinsmon Lancaster (Nick Gatto kick), 7:29
- Dallas – Phil Bogle 6-yard pass from Daniel Raudabaugh (Mark Lewis kick no good), 1:26
- Bossier–Shreveport – Kinsmon Lancaster 43-yard run (Nick Gatto kick), 0:57
- Dallas – Kenny Henderson 25-yard pass from Daniel Raudabaugh (Mark Lewis kick), 0:43
- Bossier–Shreveport – James Jordan 47-yard pass from Kinsmon Lancaster (Nick Gatto kick), 0:32

Passing

- Dallas – Daniel Raudabaugh: 22/29, 228 yards, 3 TD, 1 INT
- Bossier–Shreveport – Kinsmon Lancaster: 22/38, 233 yards, 5 TD, 1 INT

Rushing

- Dallas – Tommy Taggart: 2 att, 2 yards
- Bossier–Shreveport – Kinsmon Lancaster: 6 att, 65 yards, 2 TD

Receiving

- Dallas – Kenny Henderson: 9 att, 146 yards, 2 TD
- Bossier–Shreveport – James Jordan: 10 att, 140 yards, 4 TD
