= Tyrone Timmons =

American gridiron football player (born 1984)

No. 5
- Position: Wide receiver

Personal information
- Born: July 7, 1984 (age 42); Tampa, Florida, U.S.
- Listed height: 6 ft 4 in (1.93 m)
- Listed weight: 220 lb (100 kg)

Career information
- High school: Tampa Bay (FL) Technical
- College: Mississippi Valley State
- NFL draft: 2007: undrafted

Career history
- Kansas City Chiefs (2007)*; Tampa Bay Storm (2007–2008); RiverCity Rage (2009); Winnipeg Blue Bombers (2009)*; Florida Tuskers (2009)*; Tampa Bay Storm (2010)
- * Offseason or practice squad member only

Awards and highlights
- 2x All-SWAC (2005-2006); 2x Division I-AA All-American (2005-2006)

Career AFL statistics
- Receptions: 215
- Receiving yards: 2,705
- Receiving TDs: 85
- Tackles: 4
- Pass breakups: 2
- Stats at ArenaFan.com

Tyrone Timmons (born July 7, 1984) is a former professional American football wide receiver. He was signed by the Kansas City Chiefs as an undrafted free agent in 2007. He played college football for the Mississippi Valley State Delta Devils. He was inducted into the Mississippi Valley State University Hall of Fame in April 2017.

Timmons was also a member of the Tampa Bay Storm, RiverCity Rage, Winnipeg Blue Bombers, and Florida Tuskers.

Timmons is the Single Season TD leader for the Tampa Bay Storm Franchise and was named one of the Best High School football players to play in the Tampa Bay area.

== Early life ==
Timmons played QB at Tampa Bay Tech in Tampa, Florida. As a junior, he led his team to the school's first ever District Championship in 2000. He was selected 2nd team All Western Conference and HM All County. As a senior, he led his team to the Western Conference Championship and made a return trip to the playoffs. He was selected 2nd team All Western Conference, 2nd team All County, a National Football Foundation Scholar Athlete and was selected to the Hillsborough County East All Star Team.

== College career ==
Timmons finished his career at Mississippi Valley State with 148 receptions, 2,285 yards and 17 touchdowns. He finished second all time to Jerry Rice in receptions and yards and is one of three receivers in school history to achieve 1,000 yards receiving in a season. He also was a two-time All-SWAC selection and Division I-AA All-American in 2005 and 2006. Timmons was selected for the first annual Texas vs The Nation All-Star Game.

In 2003, he set the freshman school record for the most catches, yards per game and receiving yards in MVSU history. He is named MVSU's greatest freshmen WR of the 2000 era and the greatest overall WR of the 2000 era. Timmons is named on MVSU’s All-Time All freshman team, 2000’s All-time All Decade team, All-Time All two-way player team, and All-Time All-Academic team. He is also ranked in the top 100 football players in MVSU history.

== Professional career ==
With The Tampa Bay Storm, Timmons was inactive through the team’s first 12 games of the 2008 season but made a big impact through the team’s final four games. He finished with 23 receptions for 267 yards and 13 touchdowns.

Timmons started his AFL debut on May 23, 2008. He received player of the game honors with 7 catches, 69 yards and 3 touchdowns in the win over The Cleveland Gladiators.

Timmons is the 6th player in Arena Football history to record 9 touchdowns in his first 3 games, joining arena football legend Eddie Brown. He then became Rookie of the year for the Tampa Bay Storm franchise for the 2008 season.

He was signed by the Winnipeg Blue Bombers on May 6, 2009. He was released on June 13, 2009.

Timmons signed back to the Storm December 15, 2009 for the start of the new re-vamped Arena Football League that suspended play at the end of the 2008 season.

The start of 2010 seemed to be a continuation of dominance lingering from the 2008 Tampa Bay Storm Rookie of the year. Timmons started the year off on fire. Through the first 3 games his stats compiled to: 29 receptions 407 yards and 11 touchdowns.

As the regular season progressed, Timmons quietly went about his business to lead the team in receptions (118) and touchdowns receptions (37) surpassing the single-season record of 35 set by Hall of Famer George LaFrance in 1998. He finished all together with 138 receptions for 1582 yards and 44 touchdowns for the 2010 season.

In game one vs the Tulsa Talons, Tyrone Timmons led all receivers with 181 yards, 11 grabs and notched five touchdowns, his sixth consecutive career multi-touchdown game. He set career single-game highs in receptions, receiving yards and touchdowns. He also managed to score 5 more touchdowns with 9 grabs for 106 yards in week 13 vs Bossier City.

For the 2010 season Timmons had 7 games with more than 100 yards and 11 games with 7 or more catches. He scored at least 1 touchdown in 18 out of 19 games and had 14 multi-touchdown games. Timmons finished the season in the top ten in the AFL for Touchdowns and Receptions.

In 19 out of 24 total games, Timmons has managed to score 2 or more tds per game and has scored at least one touchdown per game in 23 out of 24 contests.
