= North Carolina =

U.S. state

- State
- Flag Seal
- Nicknames: The Tarheel State, The Old North State
- Motto(s): Esse quam videri (Note: In 1893, the North Carolina General Assembly adopted the Latin words "Esse Quam Videri" as the state motto and directed that these words be placed with the state's coat of arms and the date "20 May 1775" upon the great seal.) "To be, rather than to seem"
- Anthem: "The Old North State"
- Location of North Carolina within the United States
- Country: United States
- Before statehood: Colony of North Carolina
- Admitted to the Union: November 21, 1789 (12th)
- Capital: Raleigh
- Largest city: Charlotte
- Largest county or equivalent: Wake
- Largest metro and urban areas: Charlotte

Government
  - Governor: Josh Stein (D)
  - Lieutenant Governor: Rachel Hunt (D)
- Legislature: General Assembly
  - Upper house: Senate
  - Lower house: House of Representatives
- Judiciary: North Carolina Supreme Court
- U.S. senators: Thom Tillis (R); Ted Budd (R)
- U.S. House delegation: 10 Republicans; 4 Democrats; (list)

Area
  - Total: 53,819.2 sq mi (139,391.0 km^{2})
  - Land: 48,617.9 sq mi (125,919.8 km^{2})
  - Water: 5,201.3 sq mi (13,471.2 km^{2}) 9.66%
  - Rank: 28th

Dimensions
  - Length: 500 mi (810 km)
  - Width: 191 mi (307 km)
- Elevation: 690 ft (210 m)
- Highest elevation (Mount Mitchell (Note: Elevation adjusted to North American Vertical Datum of 1988)): 6,683 ft (2,037 m)
- Lowest elevation (Atlantic Ocean): 0 ft (0 m)

Population (2025)
  - Total: ▲11,197,968
  - Rank: 9th
  - Density: 214.72/sq mi (82.90/km^{2})
  - Rank: 14th
  - Median household income: $70,800 (2023)
  - Income rank: 35th
- Demonym(s): North Carolinian (official); Tarheel (colloquial)

Language
  - Official language: English
  - Spoken language: As of 2010: English 90.70%; Spanish 6.93%; Other 2.73%
- Time zone: UTC−05:00 (Eastern)
  - Summer (DST): UTC−04:00 (EDT)
- USPS abbreviation: NC
- ISO 3166 code: US-NC
- Traditional abbreviation: N.C.
- Latitude: 33° 50′ N to 36° 35′ N
- Longitude: 75° 28′ W to 84° 19′ W
- Website: nc.gov

State symbols of North Carolina
List of state symbols
- Flag of North Carolina

- Seal of North Carolina
- Motto: Esse quam videri ("To be, rather than to seem")
- Slogan: First in Flight, First in Freedom (unofficial)
- Song: "The Old North State"

Living insignia
- Amphibian: Pine Barrens tree frog
- Bird: Cardinal
- Butterfly: Eastern tiger swallowtail
- Dog breed: Plott Hound
- Fish: Red drum
- Flower: Flowering dogwood
- Insect: Western honey bee
- Mammal: Eastern gray squirrel
- Marsupial: Virginia opossum
- Reptile: Eastern box turtle
- Tree: Pine

Inanimate insignia
- Beverage: Milk
- Color(s): Red and blue
- Dance: Carolina shag
- Food: Scuppernong grape and sweet potato
- Fossil: Megalodon teeth
- Gemstone: Emerald
- Mineral: Gold
- Rock: Granite
- Shell: Scotch bonnet
- Other: Marbled salamander (salamander)

State route marker

State quarter
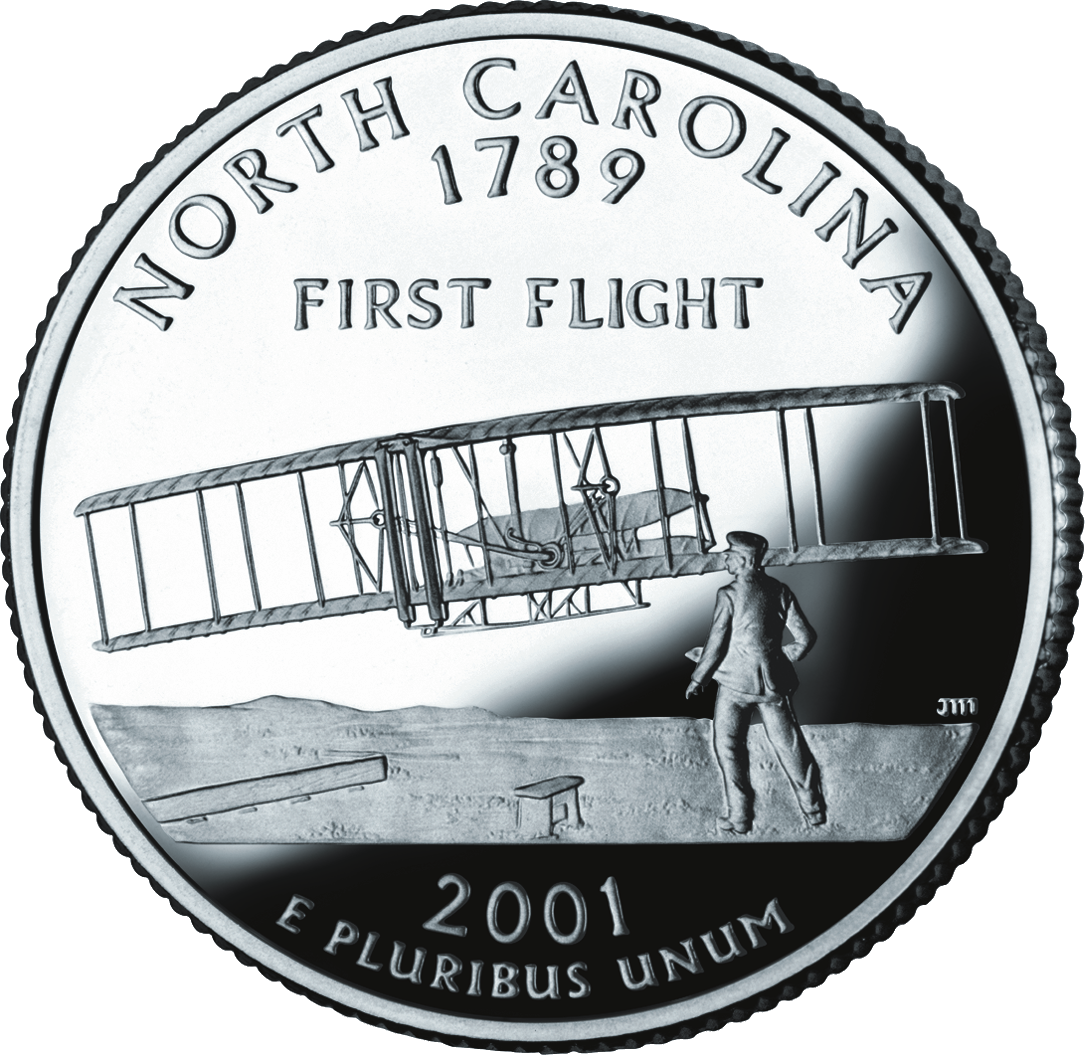
- Released in 2001

North Carolina (/ˌkærəˈlaɪnə/ KAYR-ə-LIE-nə) is a state in the Southeastern and South Atlantic regions of the United States. It is bordered by Virginia to the north, the Atlantic Ocean to the east, South Carolina to the south, Georgia to the southwest, and Tennessee to the west. The state is the 28th-largest and ninth-most populous of the United States. Along with South Carolina, it makes up the Carolinas region of the East Coast. At the 2020 census, the state had a population of 10,439,388. Raleigh is the state's capital and Charlotte is its most populous and one of the fastest growing cities in the United States. The Charlotte metropolitan area, with an estimated population of 2,883,370 in 2024, is the most populous metropolitan area in North Carolina, the 21st-most populous in the United States, and the largest banking center in the nation after New York City. The Research Triangle, with an estimated population of 2,368,947 in 2023, is the second-most populous combined metropolitan area in the state, 31st-most populous in the United States, and is home to the largest research park in the United States, Research Triangle Park.

== Overview ==
The earliest evidence of human occupation in North Carolina dates back 10,000 years, found at the Hardaway Site. North Carolina was inhabited by tribes of Native Americans prior to the arrival of Europeans. King Charles II granted eight lord proprietors a colony they named Carolina after the king and which was established in 1670 with the first permanent settlement at Charles Town (now Charleston, South Carolina). Because of the difficulty of governing the entire colony from Charles Town, the colony was eventually divided and North Carolina was established as a royal colony in 1729 and was one of the Thirteen Colonies. The Halifax Resolves resolution adopted by North Carolina on April 12, 1776, was the first formal call for independence from Great Britain among the American Colonies during the American Revolution.

On November 21, 1789, North Carolina became the 12th state to ratify the United States Constitution. In the run-up to the American Civil War, North Carolina declared its secession from the Union on May 20, 1861, becoming the tenth of eleven states to join the Confederate States of America. Following the Civil War, the state was restored to the Union on July 4, 1868. On December 17, 1903, Orville and Wilbur Wright successfully piloted the world's first controlled, sustained flight of a powered, heavier-than-air aircraft at Kitty Hawk in North Carolina's Outer Banks. North Carolina often uses the slogan "First in Flight" on state license plates to commemorate this achievement, alongside a newer alternative design bearing the slogan "First in Freedom" in reference to the Mecklenburg Declaration and Halifax Resolves.

North Carolina is defined by a wide range of elevations and landscapes. From west to east, North Carolina's elevation descends from the Appalachian Mountains to the Piedmont and Atlantic coastal plain. North Carolina's Mount Mitchell at 6,684 ft (2,037 m) is the highest point in North America east of the Black Hills, in South Dakota. Most of the state falls in the humid subtropical climate zone; however, the western, mountainous part of the state has a subtropical highland climate.

== History ==
=== Native Americans, lost colony, and permanent settlement ===
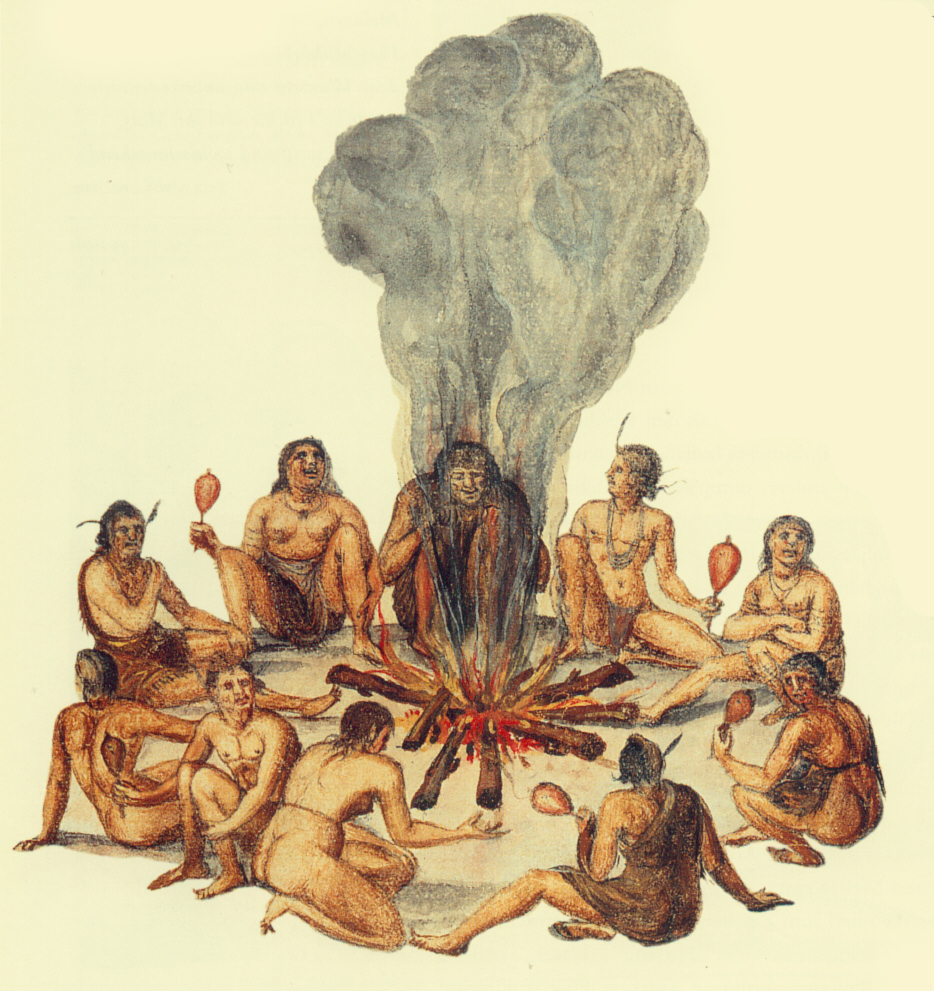
Ceremony of Secotan warriors in North Carolina. Watercolor painted by English colonist John White in 1585.

North Carolina was inhabited for at least 10,000 years by succeeding prehistoric Indigenous cultures. The Hardaway Site saw major periods of occupation dating to 10,000 years BCE. Before 200 AD, people were building earthwork platform mounds for ceremonial and religious purposes. Succeeding peoples, including those of the South Appalachian Mississippian culture, established by 1000 AD in the Piedmont and mountain region, continued to build this style of mounds. In contrast to some of the larger centers of the classic Mississippian culture in the area that became known as the western Carolinas, northeastern Georgia, and southeastern Tennessee, most of the larger towns had only one central platform mound. Smaller settlements had none, but were close to more prominent towns. This area became known as the homelands of the historic Cherokee people, who are believed to have migrated over time from the Great Lakes area.

In the 500–700 years preceding European contact, the Mississippian culture built elaborate cities and maintained far-flung regional trading networks. Its largest city was Cahokia, which had numerous mounds for different purposes, a highly stratified society, and was located in present-day southwestern Illinois near the Mississippi River. Starting in 1540, the Native polities of the Mississippian culture fell apart and reformed as new groups, such as the Catawba, due to a series of destabilizing events known as the "Mississippian shatter zone". Introduction of colonial trading arrangements and hostile native groups from the north such as the Westo Indians hastened changes in an already tenuous regional hierarchy. As described by anthropologist Robbie Ethridge, the Mississippian shatter zone was a time of great instability in what is now the American South, caused by the instability of Mississippian chiefdoms, high mortality from new Eurasian diseases, conversion to an agricultural society and the accompanying population increase, and the emergence of Native "militaristic slaving societies".

Historically documented tribes in the North Carolina region include various Algonquian peoples, such as the Chowanoc, Roanoke, Pamlico and Machapunga, who were the first encountered by the English; Iroquoian peoples such as the Meherrin, Cherokee, and Tuscarora; and others, such as the Cheraw, Coree, Waxhaw, Saponi, Waccamaw, Cape Fear Indians, Yuchi and Catawba.

The first documented European exploration of the coast of present-day North Carolina was undertaken by the Florentine navigator Giovanni da Verrazzano, who sailed in the service of the French Crown. In 1524, during his expedition along the Atlantic coast of North America, Verrazzano visited and explored the region between present-day Cape Fear and Pamlico Sound, providing the first known European description of that area. The primary record of this voyage is the letter Verrazzano sent to King Francis I of France, preserved in several manuscript copies, including the Cèllère Codex, which describes in detail the geography, Indigenous peoples, and natural features of the explored coast.

In the late 16th century, the first Spanish explorers traveling inland recorded meeting Mississippian culture people at Joara, a regional chiefdom near what later developed as Morganton. Records of Hernando de Soto attested to his meeting with them in 1540. In 1567, Captain Juan Pardo led an expedition to claim the area for the Spanish colony and to establish another route to reach silver mines in Mexico. Pardo made a winter base at Joara, which he renamed Cuenca. His expedition built Fort San Juan and left a contingent of 30 Spaniards there, while Pardo traveled further. His forces built and garrisoned five other forts. He returned by a different route to Santa Elena on Parris Island, South Carolina, then a center of Spanish Florida. In the spring of 1568, natives killed all but seventy four of the Spaniards and burned the six forts in the interior, including Fort San Juan. Although the Spanish never returned to the interior, this effort marked the first European attempt at colonization of the interior of what became the United States. A 16th-century journal by Pardo's scribe Bandera, and archaeological findings since 1986 at Joara, have confirmed the settlement.

=== Anglo-European settlement ===
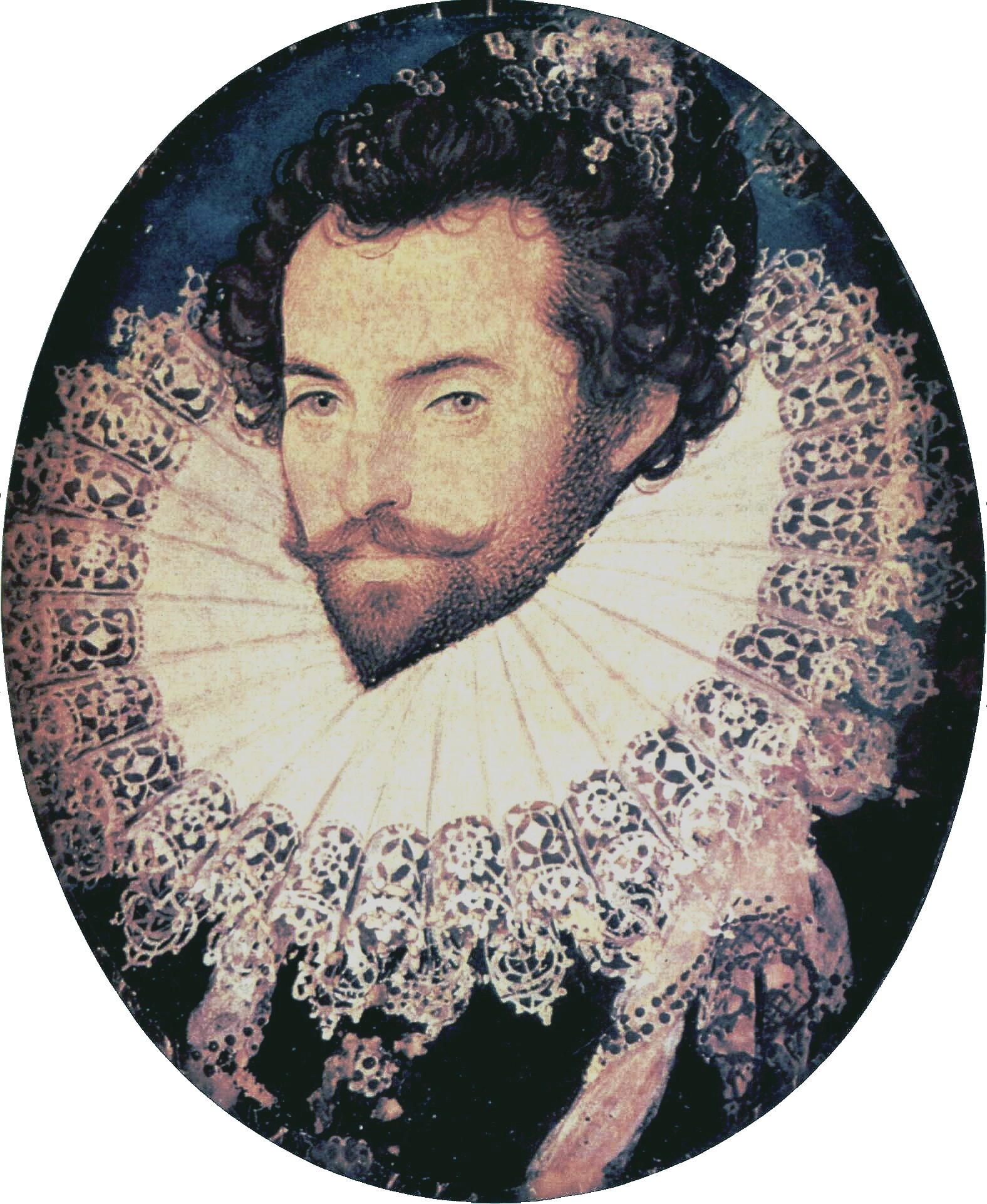
Sir Walter Raleigh, namesake of the state capital of North Carolina, Raleigh

In 1584, Elizabeth I granted a charter to Sir Walter Raleigh, for whom the state capital is named, for land in present-day North Carolina (then part of the territory of Virginia). It was the second American territory that the English attempted to colonize. Raleigh established two colonies on the coast in the late 1580s, but both failed. The colony established in 1587 saw 118 colonists 'disappear' when John White was unable to return from a supply run during battles with the Spanish Armada. The fate of the "Lost Colony" of Roanoke Island remains one of the most widely debated mysteries of American history. Two native Chieftains, Manteo and Wanchese, of which the former helped the colonists and the latter was distrustful, had involvement in the colony and even accompanied Raleigh to England on a previous voyage in 1585. Manteo was also the first Indigenous North American to be baptized by English settlers. Upon White's return in 1590, neither native nor Englishman were to be found. Popular theory holds that the colonists either traveled away with or assimilated into local native culture. Virginia Dare, the first English person to be born in North America, was born on Roanoke Island on August 18, 1587; the surrounding Dare County is named for her.

As early as 1650, settlers from the Virginia colony had moved into the Albemarle Sound region. By 1663, King Charles II of England granted a charter to start a new colony on the North American continent; this would generally establish North Carolina's borders. He named it Carolina in honor of his father, Charles I. By 1665, a second charter was issued to attempt to resolve territorial questions. This charter rewarded the Lords Proprietors, eight Englishmen to whom King Charles II granted joint ownership of a tract of land in the state. All of these men either had remained loyal to the Crown or aided Charles's restoration to the English throne after Cromwell. In 1712, owing to disputes over governance, the Carolina colony split into North Carolina and South Carolina. North Carolina became a crown colony in 1729.

Most of the English colonists had arrived as indentured servants, hiring themselves out as laborers for a fixed period to pay for their passage. In the early years the line between indentured servants and African slaves or laborers was fluid. Some Africans were allowed to earn their freedom before slavery became a lifelong status. Most of the free colored families formed in North Carolina before the Revolution were descended from unions or marriages between free whites and enslaved or free Africans or African-Americans. If the mothers were free, their children were born free. Many had migrated or were descendants of migrants from colonial Virginia. As the flow of indentured laborers to the colony decreased with improving economic conditions in Great Britain, planters imported more slaves, and the state's legal delineations between free and slave status tightened, effectively hardening the latter into a racial caste. Conditions for both slaves and workers worsened as the ranks of the former eclipsed the latter and expansion of farming operations into former Indigenous territories lowered prices. Unable to establish deep water ports such as at Charles Town and Norfolk, the economy's growth and prosperity was thus based on cheap labor and slave plantation systems, devoted primarily to the production of tobacco, then later cotton and textiles.

In 1738–1739, smallpox caused high fatalities among the Native Americans, who had no immunity to the new disease (it had become endemic over centuries in Europe). According to the historian Russell Thornton, "The 1738 epidemic was said to have killed one-half of the Cherokee, with other tribes of the area suffering equally."

=== Colonial period ===
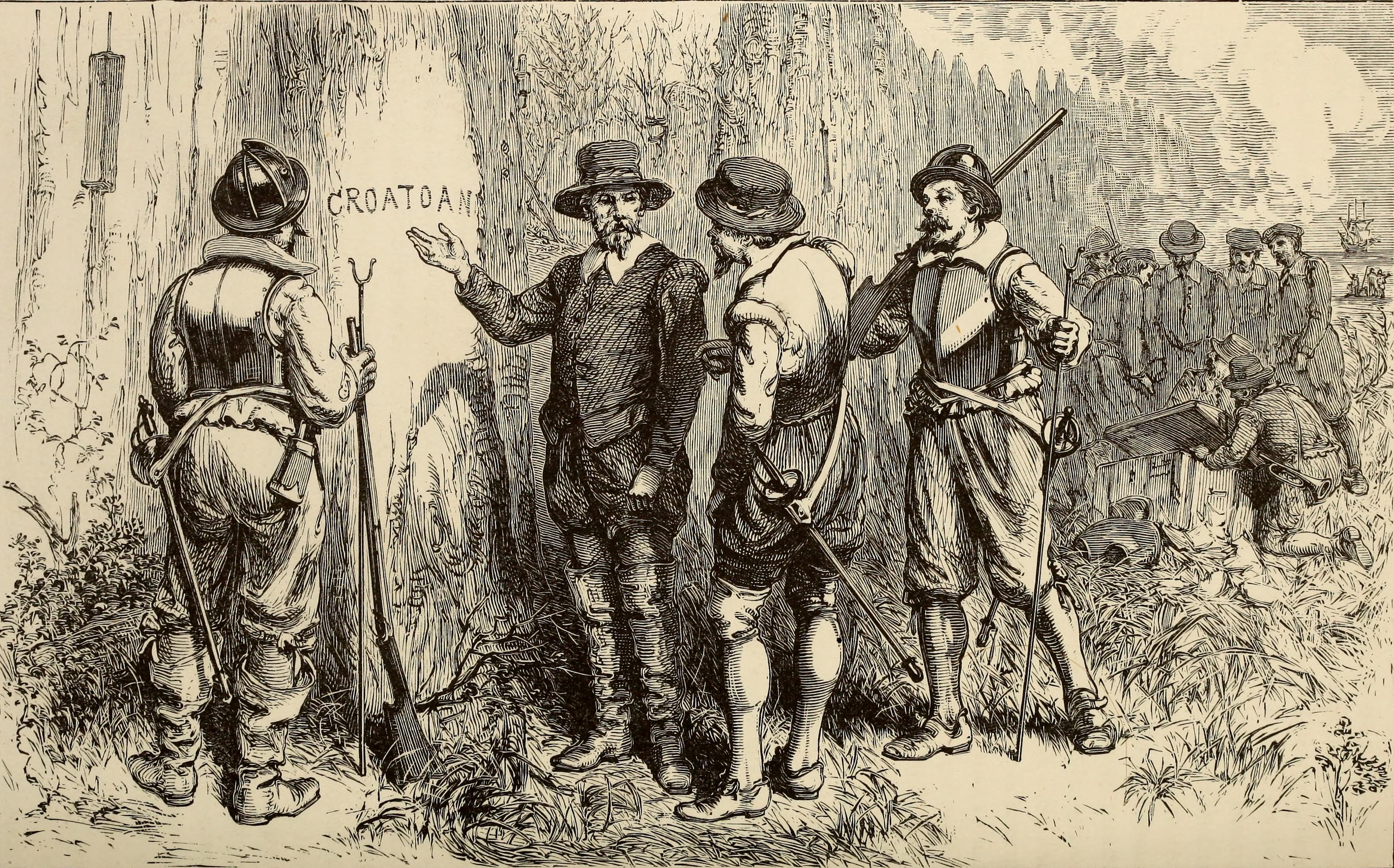
John White returns to find the colony abandoned

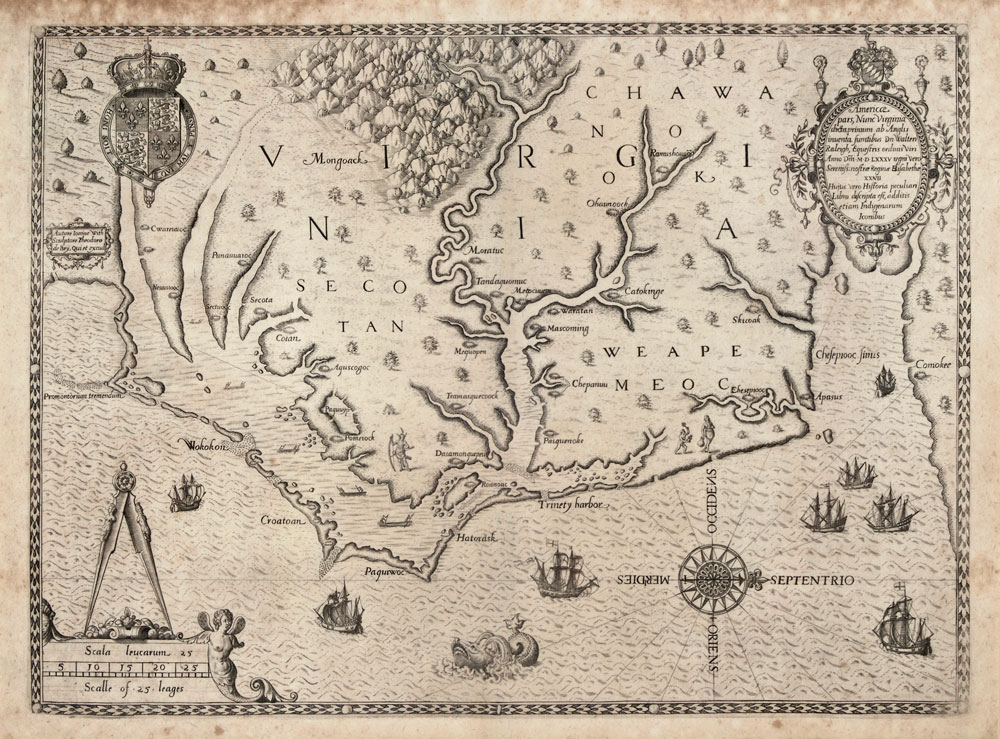
Map of the coast of Virginia and North Carolina, drawn 1585–1586 by Theodor de Bry, based on map by John White of the Roanoke Colony

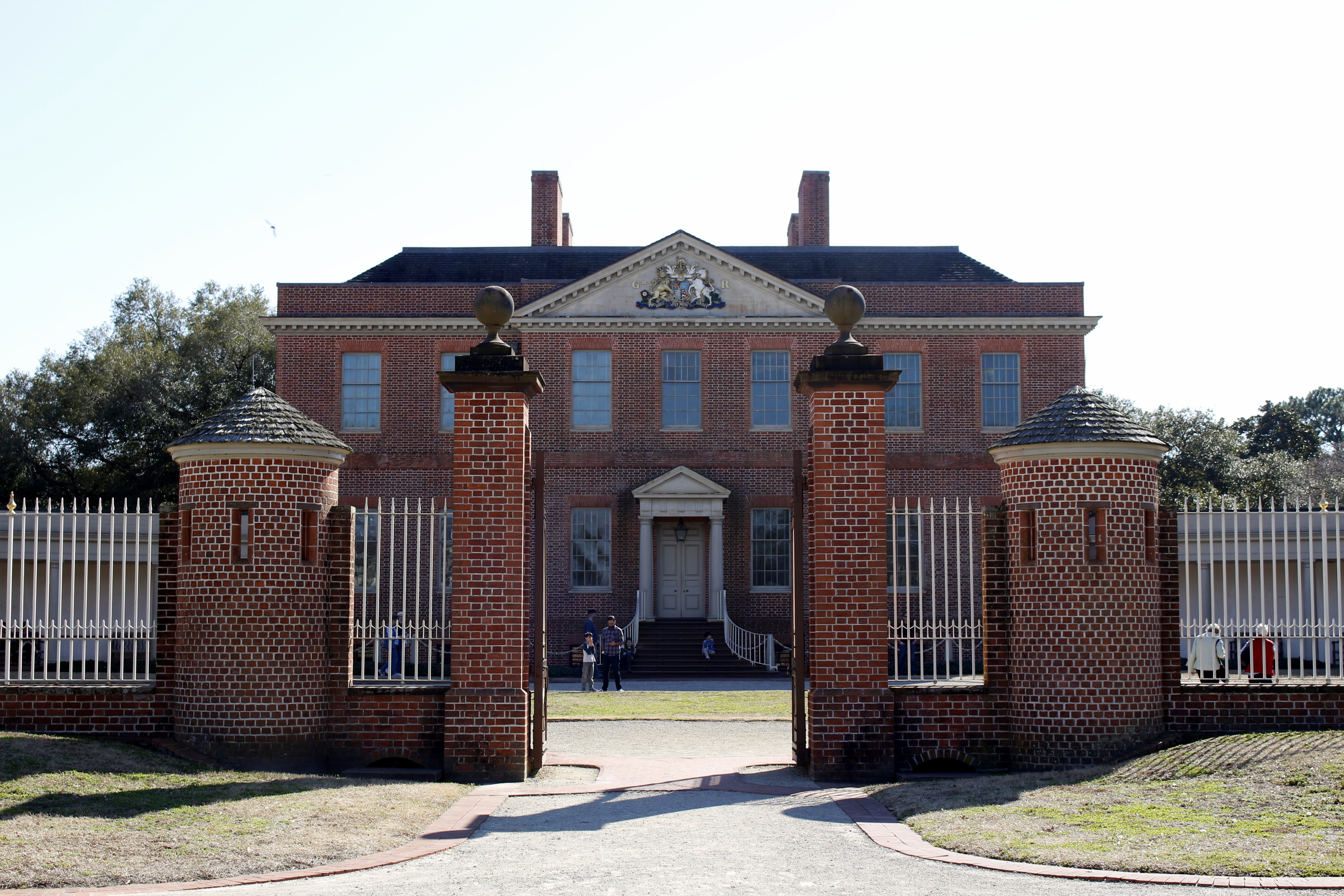
Reconstructed royal governor's mansion Tryon Palace in New Bern

After the Spanish in the 16th century, the first permanent European settlers of North Carolina were English colonists who migrated south from Virginia. Virginia had grown rapidly and land was less available. Nathaniel Batts was documented as one of the first of these Virginian migrants. He settled south of the Chowan River and east of the Great Dismal Swamp in 1655. By 1663, this northeastern area of the Province of Carolina, known as the Albemarle Settlements, was undergoing full-scale English settlement. During the same period, the English monarch Charles II gave provincial land grants to the Lords Proprietors, the group of noblemen who had helped restore him to the throne in 1660. These grants were predicated on an agreement that the Lords would use their influence to bring in colonists and establish ports of trade. This new Province of Carolina was named in honor and memory of his father, Charles I (Latin: Carolus).

Lacking a viable coastal port city due to geography, towns grew at a slower pace and remained small. By the late 17th century, Carolina was essentially two colonies, one centered in the Albemarle region in the north and the other located in the south around Charleston. In 1705 South Carolinian John Lawson purchased land on the Pamlico River and laid out Bath, North Carolina's first town. After returning to England, he published the book A New Voyage to Carolina, which became a travelogue and a marketing piece to encourage new colonists to Carolina. Lawson encouraged Baron Christoph von Graffenried, the leader of a group of Swiss and German Protestants, to immigrate to Carolina. Von Graffenried purchased land between the Neuse and the Trent Rivers and established the town of New Bern. After an attack on New Bern in which hundreds were killed or injured, Lawson was caught then executed by Tuscarora Indians. A large revolt happened in the state in 1711, known as Cary's Rebellion. In 1712, North Carolina became a separate colony, and in 1729 it became a royal colony, with the exception of the Earl Granville holdings.

In June 1718, Queen Anne's Revenge, the flagship of pirate Blackbeard, ran aground at Beaufort Inlet, North Carolina, in present-day Carteret County. After the grounding, her crew and supplies were transferred to smaller ships. In November 1718, after appealing to the governor of North Carolina, who promised safe-haven and a pardon, Blackbeard was killed in an ambush by troops from Virginia. In 1996, Intersal, Inc., a private maritime research firm, discovered the remains of a vessel likely to be the Queen Anne's Revenge, which was added to the U.S. National Register of Historic Places.

North Carolina became one of the Thirteen Colonies and with the territory of South Carolina was originally known as the Province of North Carolina. The northern and southern parts of the original province separated in 1712, with North Carolina becoming a royal colony in 1729. Originally settled by small farmers, sometimes having a few slaves, who were oriented toward subsistence agriculture, the colony lacked large cities or towns. Pirates menaced the coastal settlements, but by 1718 piracy in the Carolinas was on the decline. Growth was strong in the middle of the 18th century, as the economy attracted Scots-Irish, Quaker, English and German immigrants. A majority of the North Carolina colonists generally supported the American Revolution, although there were some Loyalists. Loyalists in North Carolina were fewer in number than in some other colonies such as Georgia, South Carolina, Delaware, and New York.

During colonial times, Bath was the first provincial capital after the formation of North Carolina from the province of Carolina in 1712, followed by Edenton beginning in 1722, followed by New Bern becoming the capital in 1766. Construction of Tryon Palace, which served as the residence and offices of the provincial governor William Tryon, began in 1767 and was completed in 1771. In 1788, Raleigh was chosen as the site of the new capital, as its central location protected it from coastal attacks. Officially established in 1792 as both county seat and state capital, the city was named after Sir Walter Raleigh, sponsor of Roanoke, the "lost colony" on Roanoke Island. The population of the colony more than quadrupled from 52,000 in 1740 to 270,000 in 1780 from high immigration from Virginia, Maryland and Pennsylvania, plus immigrants from abroad.

North Carolina did not have any printer or print shops until 1749, when the North Carolina Assembly commissioned James Davis from Williamsburg Virginia to act as their official printer. Before this time the laws and legal journals of North Carolina were handwritten and were kept in a largely disorganized manner, prompting the hiring of Davis. Davis settled in New Bern, married, and in 1755 was appointed by Benjamin Franklin as North Carolina's first postmaster. In October of that year the North Carolina Assembly awarded Davis a contract to carry mail between Wilmington, North Carolina and Suffolk, Virginia. He was also active in North Carolina politics as a member of the Assembly and later as the Sheriff. Davis also founded and printed the North-Carolina Gazette, North Carolina's first newspaper, printed in his printing house in New Bern.

Differences in the settlement patterns of eastern and western North Carolina, or the Atlantic coastal plain and uplands, affected the political, economic, and social life of the state from the 18th until the 20th century. Eastern North Carolina was settled chiefly by immigrants from rural England and Gaelic speakers from the Scottish Highlands. The Piedmont upcountry and western mountain region of North Carolina was settled chiefly by Scots-Irish, English, and German Protestants, the so-called "cohee". Arriving during the mid-to-late 18th century, the Scots-Irish, people of Scottish descent who migrated to and then emigrated from what is today Northern Ireland, were the largest non-English immigrant group before the Revolution; English indentured servants were overwhelmingly the largest immigrant group before the Revolution.

=== Revolutionary War ===
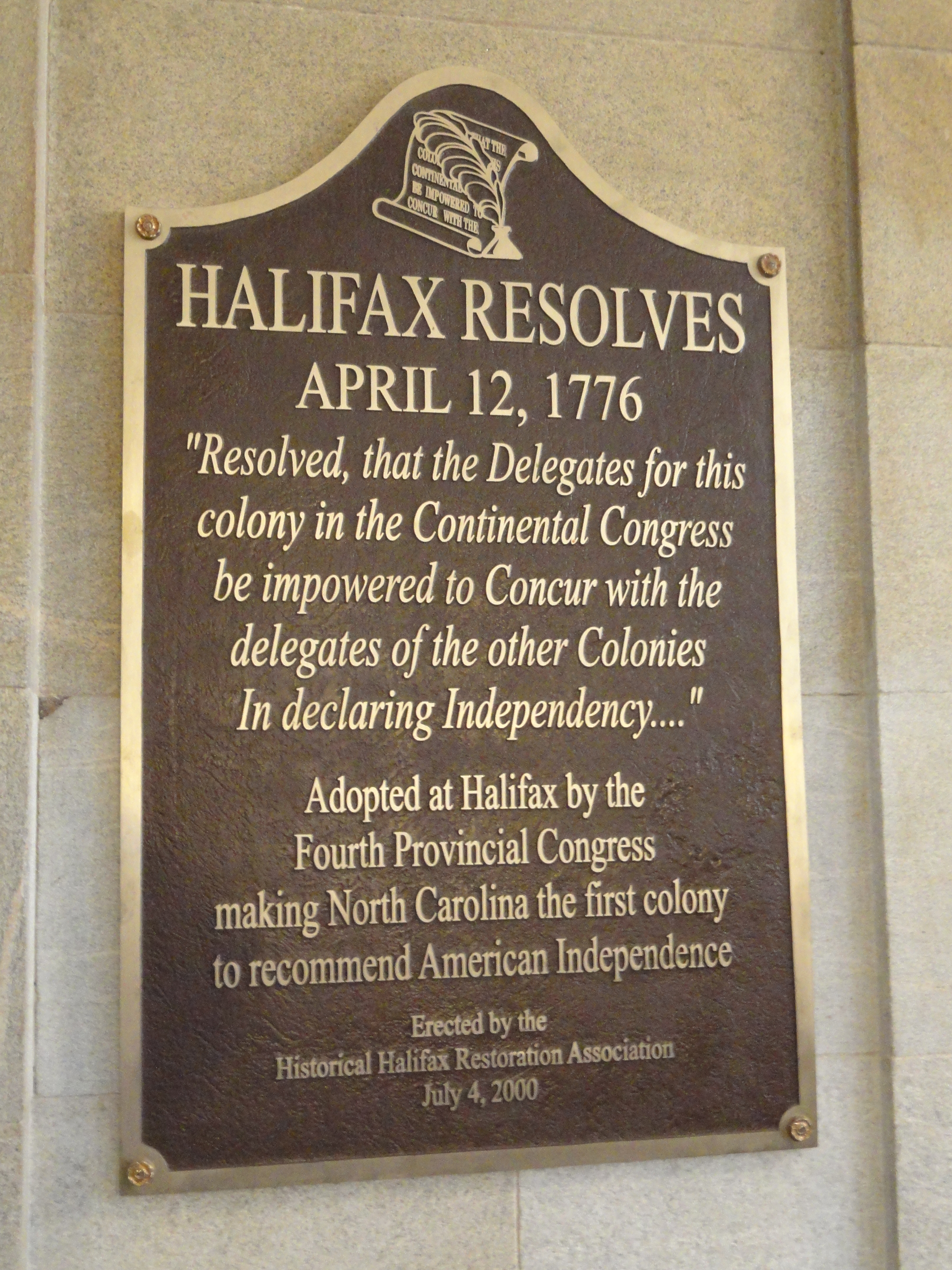
Halifax Resolves plaque inside the North Carolina State Capitol

During the American Revolutionary War, the English and Gaelic speaking Highland Scots of eastern North Carolina tended to remain loyal to the British Crown, because of longstanding business and personal connections with Great Britain. The English, Welsh, Scots-Irish, and German settlers of western North Carolina tended to favor American independence from Britain. British loyalists dubbed the Mecklenburg County area to be 'a hornet's nest' of radicals, birthing the name of the future Charlotte NBA team. On April 12, 1776, the colony became the first to instruct its delegates to the Continental Congress to vote for independence from the British Crown, through the Halifax Resolves passed by the North Carolina Provincial Congress. The date of this event is memorialized on the state flag and state seal. Throughout the Revolutionary War, fierce guerrilla warfare erupted between bands of pro-independence and pro-British colonists. In some cases the war was also an excuse to settle private grudges and rivalries.

North Carolina had around 7,800 Patriots join the Continental Army under General George Washington; and an additional 10,000 served in local militia units under such leaders as General Nathanael Greene. There was some military action, especially in 1780–81. Many Carolinian frontiersmen had moved west over the mountains, into the Washington District (later known as Tennessee), but in 1789, following the Revolution, the state was persuaded to relinquish its claim to the western lands. It ceded them to the national government so the Northwest Territory could be organized and managed nationally.

A major American victory in the war took place at King's Mountain along the North Carolina–South Carolina border; on October 7, 1780, a force of 1,000 Patriots from western North Carolina (including modern-day Tennessee) and southwest Virginia overwhelmed a force of some 1,000 British troops led by Major Patrick Ferguson. Most of the soldiers fighting for the British side in this battle were Carolinians who had remained loyal to the Crown (they were called "Tories" or Loyalists). The American victory at King's Mountain gave the advantage to colonists who favored American independence, and it prevented the British Army from recruiting new soldiers from the Tories.

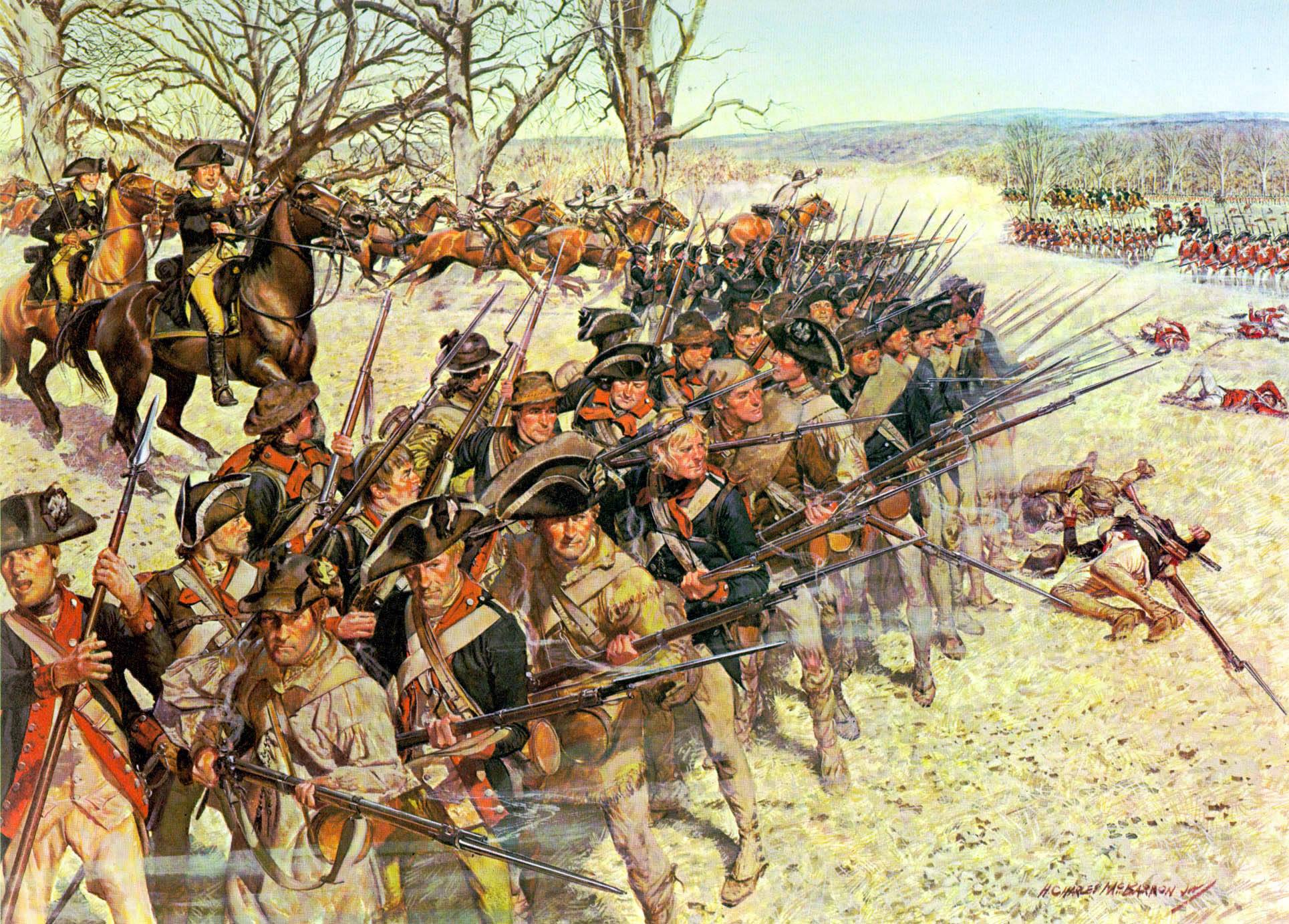
1st Maryland Regiment holding the line at the Battle of Guilford Court House, 1781

The road to Yorktown and America's independence from Great Britain led through North Carolina. As the British Army moved north from victories in Charleston and Camden, South Carolina, the Southern Division of the Continental Army and local militia prepared to meet them. Following General Daniel Morgan's victory over the British Cavalry Commander Banastre Tarleton at the Battle of Cowpens on January 17, 1781, southern commander Nathanael Greene led British Lord Charles Cornwallis across the heartland of North Carolina, and away from the latter's base of supply in Charleston, South Carolina. This campaign is known as "The Race to the Dan" or "The Race for the River".

In the Battle of Cowan's Ford, Cornwallis met resistance along the banks of the Catawba River at Cowan's Ford on February 1, 1781, in an attempt to engage General Morgan's forces during a tactical withdrawal. Morgan had moved to the northern part of the state to combine with General Greene's newly recruited forces. Generals Greene and Cornwallis finally met at the Battle of Guilford Courthouse in present-day Greensboro on March 15, 1781. Although the British troops held the field at the end of the battle, their casualties at the hands of the numerically superior Continental Army were crippling. Following this "Pyrrhic victory", Cornwallis chose to move to the Virginia coastline to get reinforcements, and to allow the Royal Navy to protect his battered army. This decision would result in Cornwallis' eventual defeat at Yorktown, Virginia, later in 1781. The Patriots' victory there guaranteed American independence. On November 21, 1789, North Carolina became the twelfth state to ratify the U.S. Constitution.

=== Antebellum period ===
After 1800, cotton and tobacco became important export crops. The eastern half of the state, especially the Coastal Plain region, developed a slave society based on a plantation system and slave labor. Planters owning large estates wielded significant political and socio-economic power in antebellum North Carolina. They placed their interests above those of the generally non-slave-holding yeoman farmers of North Carolina. While slaveholding was slightly less concentrated compared to some other Southern states, according to the 1860 census, more than 330,000 people, or 33% of the population out of 992,622 people in total, were enslaved African Americans. They lived and worked chiefly on plantations in the Piedmont and Coastal Plain regions of the state. In addition, 30,463 free people of color lived in the state. They were also mainly concentrated in the eastern coastal plain, especially at port cities such as Wilmington and New Bern, where a variety of jobs were available. Most were descendants from free African Americans who had migrated along with neighbors from Virginia during the 18th century. The majority were the descendants of unions in the working classes between white women, indentured servants or free, and African men, indentured, slave or free.

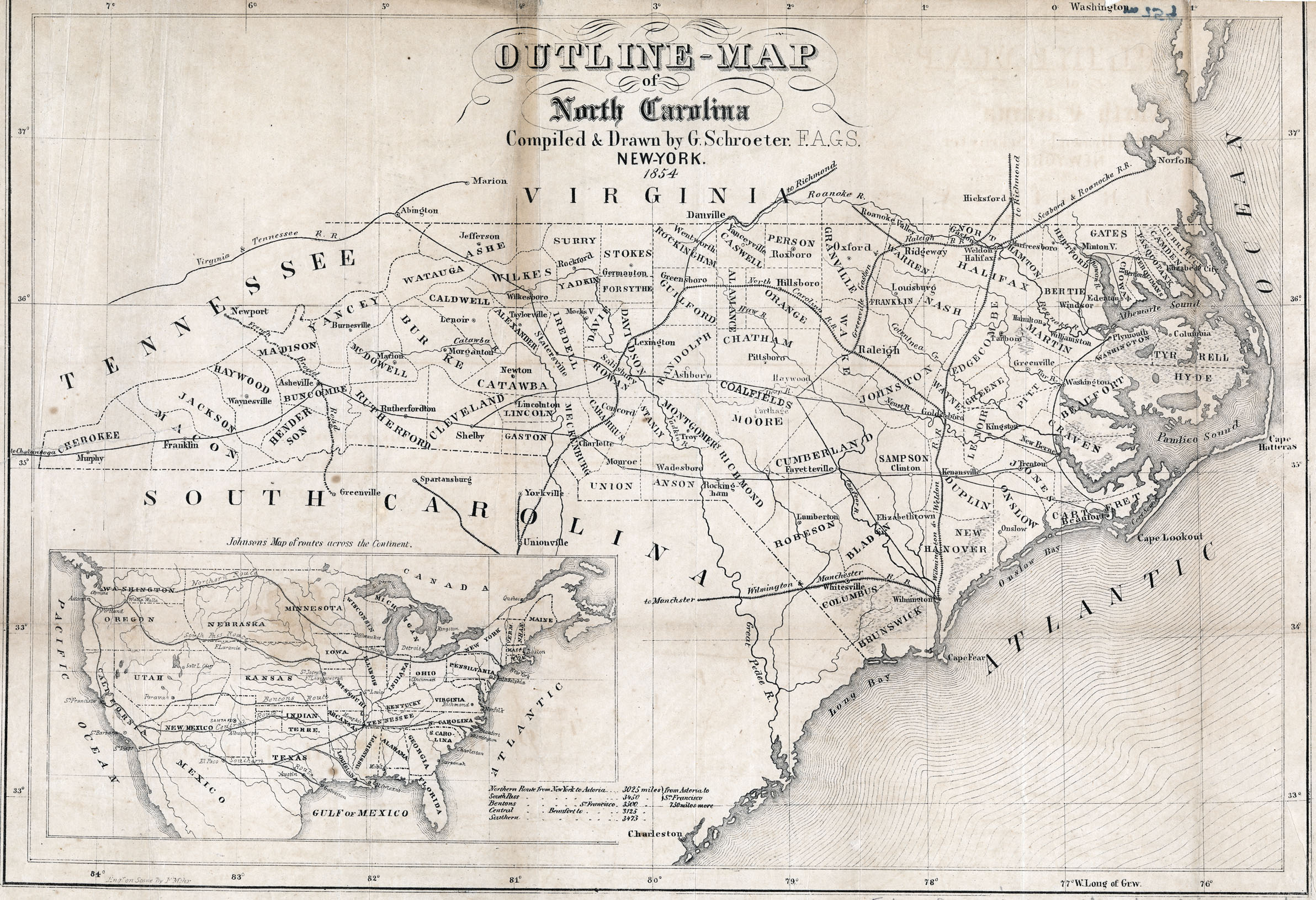
Map of the roads and railroads of North Carolina, 1854

After the American Revolution, Quakers and Mennonites worked to persuade slaveholders to free their slaves. Some were inspired by their efforts and the language of the Revolution to arrange for manumission of their slaves. The number of free people of color rose markedly in the first couple of decades after the Revolution. Many free people of color migrated to the frontier, along with their European-American neighbors, where the social system was looser. By 1810, nearly three percent of the free population consisted of free people of color, who numbered slightly more than 10,000. The western areas of North Carolina were mainly white families of European descent, especially Scotch-Irish, who operated small subsistence farms. In the early national period, the state became a center of Jeffersonian and Jacksonian democracy, with a strong Whig presence, especially in the western part of the state. After Nat Turner's slave uprising in 1831, North Carolina and other southern states reduced the rights of free blacks. In 1835, the legislature withdrew their right to vote.

In mid-century, the state's rural and commercial areas were connected by the construction of a 129 mi (208 km) wooden plank road, known as a "farmer's railroad", from Fayetteville in the east to Bethania (northwest of Winston-Salem). On October 25, 1836, construction began on the Wilmington and Raleigh Railroad to connect the port city of Wilmington with the state capital of Raleigh. In 1840, the state capitol building in Raleigh was completed, and still stands today.

In 1849, the North Carolina Railroad was created by act of the legislature to extend that railroad west to Greensboro, High Point, and Charlotte. During the Civil War, the Wilmington-to-Raleigh stretch of the railroad was vital to the Confederate war effort; supplies shipped into Wilmington were moved by rail through Raleigh to the Confederate capital of Richmond, Virginia.

=== American Civil War ===
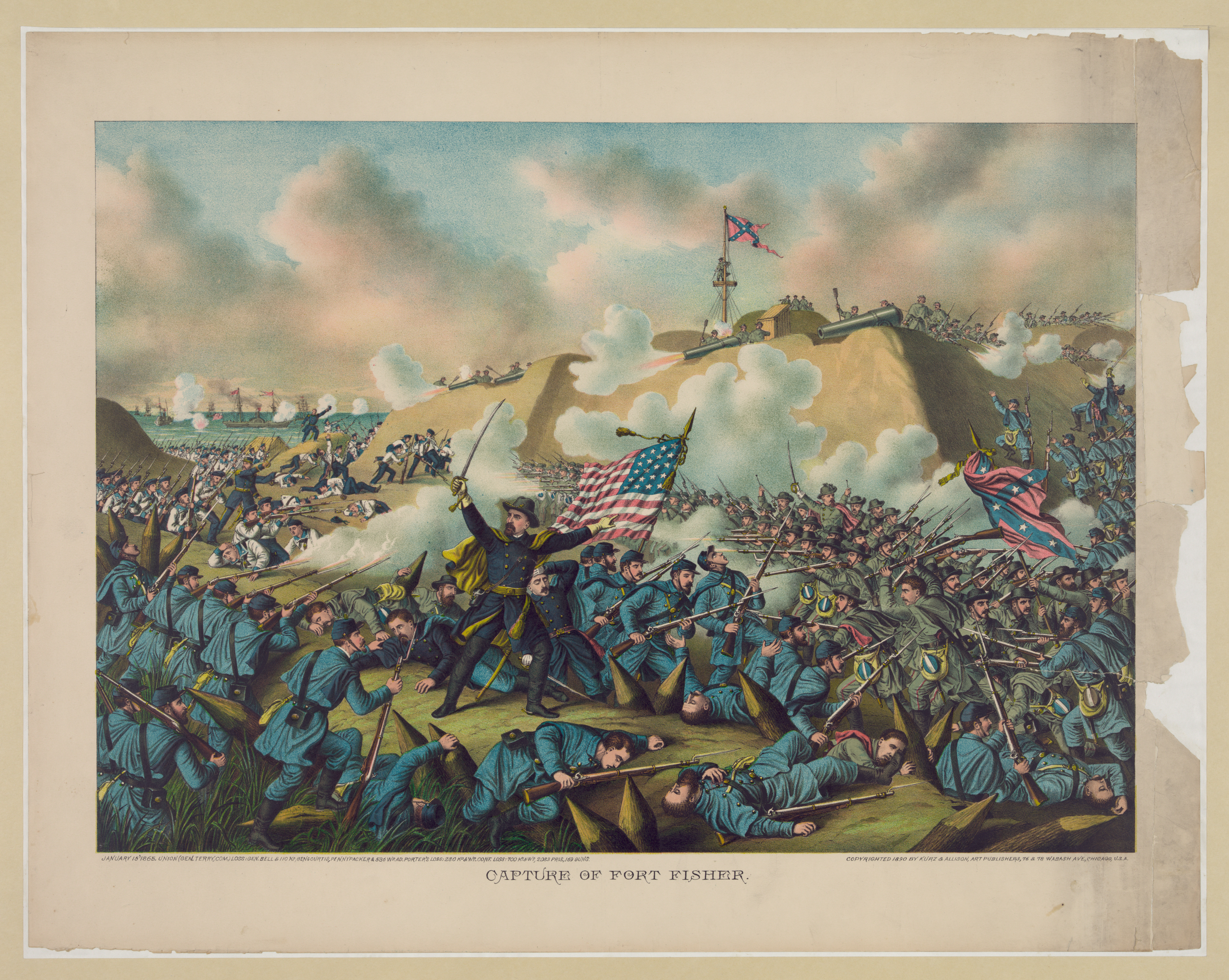
Union troops capture Fort Fisher, 1865

In 1860, North Carolina was a slave state, in which one-third of the state's total population were African-American slaves. The state did not vote to join the Confederacy until President Abraham Lincoln called on it to invade its sister state, South Carolina, becoming the last or possibly penultimate state to officially join the Confederacy. The title of "last to join the Confederacy" has been disputed; although Tennessee's informal secession on May 7, 1861, preceded North Carolina's official secession on May 20, the Tennessee legislature did not formally vote to secede until June 8, 1861.

Around 125,000 troops from North Carolina served in the Confederate Army, and about 15,000 North Carolina troops (both black and white) served in Union Army regiments, including those who left the state to join Union regiments elsewhere. Over 30,000 North Carolina troops died from combat or disease during the war. Elected in 1862, Governor Zebulon Baird Vance tried to maintain state autonomy against Confederate President Jefferson Davis in Richmond. The state government was reluctant to support the demands of the national government in Richmond, and the state was the scene of only small battles. In 1865, Durham County saw the largest single surrender of Confederate soldiers at Bennett Place, when Joseph E. Johnston surrendered the Army of Tennessee and all remaining Confederate forces still active in North Carolina, South Carolina, Georgia, and Florida, totalling 89,270 soldiers.

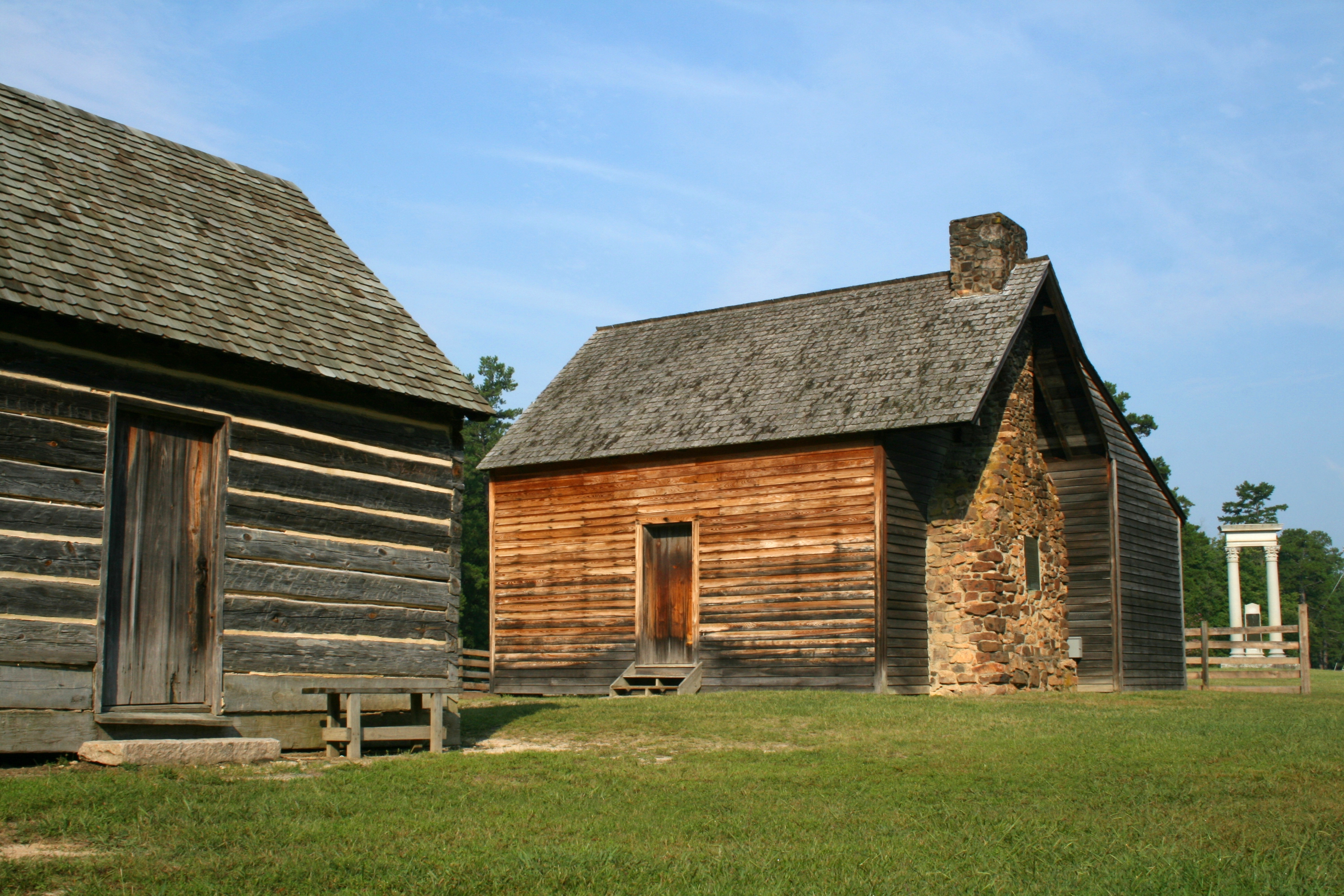
Bennett Place historic site in Durham

Confederate troops from all parts of North Carolina served in virtually all the major battles of the Army of Northern Virginia, the Confederacy's most famous army. The largest battle fought in North Carolina was at Bentonville, which was a futile attempt by Confederate General Joseph Johnston to slow Union General William Tecumseh Sherman's advance through the Carolinas in the spring of 1865. In April 1865, after losing the Battle of Morrisville, Johnston surrendered to Sherman at Bennett Place, in what is today Durham. North Carolina's port city of Wilmington, was the last Confederate port to fall to the Union, in February 1865, after the Union won the nearby Second Battle of Fort Fisher, its major defense downriver.

The first Confederate soldier to be killed in the Civil War was Private Henry Wyatt from North Carolina, in the Battle of Big Bethel in June 1861. At the Battle of Gettysburg in July 1863, the 26th North Carolina Regiment participated in Pickett/Pettigrew's Charge and advanced the farthest into Union lines of any Confederate regiment. During the Battle of Chickamauga, the 58th North Carolina Regiment advanced farther than any other regiment on Snodgrass Hill to push back the remaining Union forces from the battlefield. At Appomattox Court House in Virginia in April 1865, the 75th North Carolina Regiment, a cavalry unit, fired the last shots of the Confederate Army of Northern Virginia in the Civil War. The phrase "First at Bethel, Farthest at Gettysburg and Chickamauga, and Last at Appomattox", later became used through much of the early 20th century.

After secession, some North Carolinians refused to support the Confederacy. Some of the yeoman farmers chiefly in the state's mountains and western Piedmont region remained neutral during the Civil War, with others covertly supporting the Union cause during the conflict. Approximately 15,000 North Carolinians (both black and white) from across the state enlisted in the Union Army. Numerous slaves also escaped to Union lines, where they became essentially free.

=== Reconstruction era through late 19th century ===
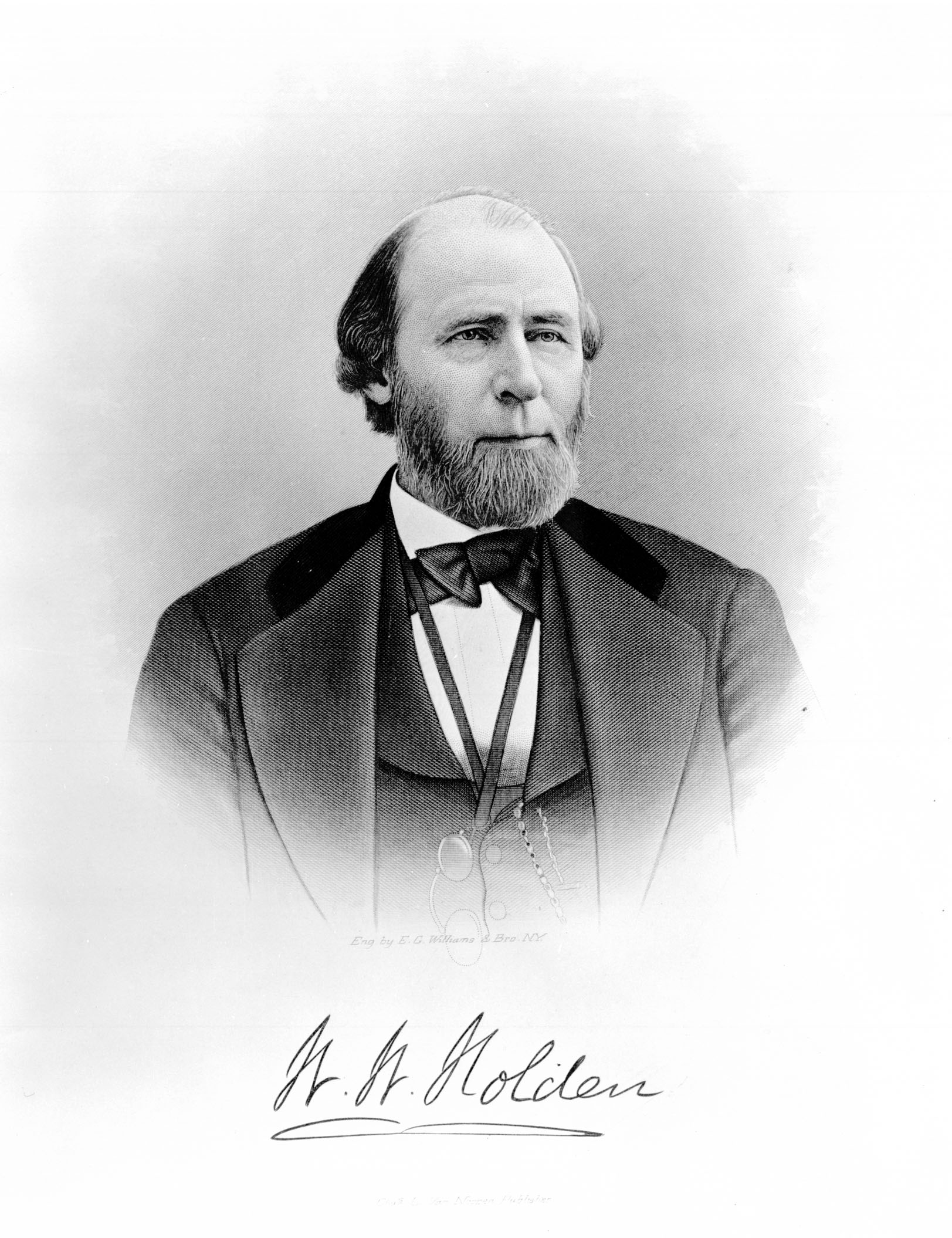
William Woods Holden, a Unionist who served as the 38th and 40th Governor of North Carolina, and during the Reconstruction era

Following the collapse of the Confederacy in 1865, North Carolina, along with other former Confederate States (except Tennessee), was put under direct control by the U.S. military and was relieved of its constitutional government and representation within the United States Congress in what is now referred to as the Reconstruction era. To earn back its rights, the state had to make concessions to Washington, one of which was ratifying the Thirteenth Amendment. Congressional Republicans during Reconstruction, commonly referred to as "radical Republicans", constantly pushed for new constitutions for each of the Southern states that emphasized equal rights for African-Americans. In 1868, a constitutional convention restored the state government of North Carolina. Though the Fifteenth Amendment was also adopted that same year, it remained in most cases ineffective for almost a century, not to mention paramilitary groups and their lynching with impunity.

The elections in April 1868 following the constitutional convention led to a narrow victory for a Republican-dominated government, with 19 African-Americans holding positions in the North Carolina State Legislature. In attempt to put the reforms into effect, the new Republican Governor William W. Holden declared martial law on any county allegedly not complying with law and order using the passage of the Shoffner Act.

A Republican Party coalition of black freedmen, northern carpetbaggers and local scalawags controlled state government for three years. The white conservative Democrats regained control of the state legislature in 1870, in part by Ku Klux Klan violence and terrorism at the polls, to suppress black voting. Republicans were elected to the governorship until 1876, when the Red Shirts, a paramilitary organization that arose in 1874 and was allied with the Democratic Party, helped suppress black voting. More than 150 black Americans were murdered in electoral violence in 1876.

Post–Civil War-debt cycles pushed people to switch from subsistence agriculture to commodity agriculture. Among this time the notorious Crop-Lien system developed and was financially difficult on landless whites and blacks, due to high amounts of usury. Also due to the push for commodity agriculture, the free range was ended. Prior to this time people fenced in their crops and had their livestock feeding on the free range areas. After the ending of the free range people now fenced their animals and had their crops in the open.

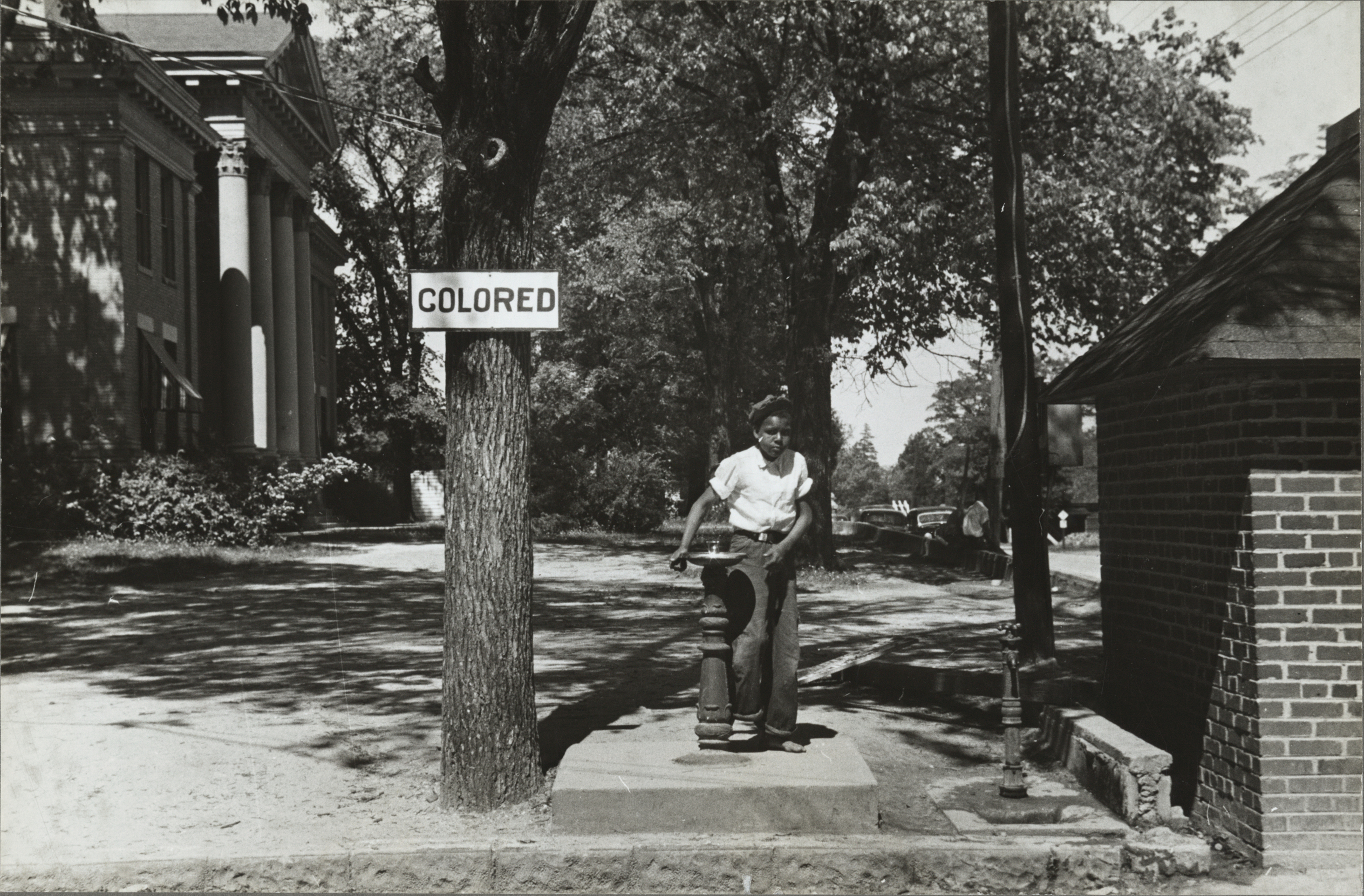
Segregated drinking fountain during the Jim Crow era in Halifax, 1938

Democrats were elected to the legislature and governor's office, but the Populists attracted voters displeased with them. In 1896 a biracial, Populist-Republican Fusionist coalition gained the governor's office and passed laws that would extend the voting franchise to blacks and poor whites. The Democrats regained control of the legislature in 1896 and passed laws to impose Jim Crow and racial segregation of public facilities. Voters of North Carolina's 2nd congressional district elected a total of four African-American congressmen through these years of the late 19th century.

Political tensions ran so high a small group of white Democrats in 1898 planned to take over the Wilmington government if their candidates were not elected. In the Wilmington massacre, white Democrats led around 2,000 of their supporters that attacked the black newspaper and neighborhood, killed an estimated 60 to 300 people, and ran off the white Republican mayor and aldermen. They installed their own people and elected Alfred M. Waddell as mayor, in the only successful coup d'état in United States history.

In 1899, the state legislature passed a new constitution, with requirements for poll taxes and literacy tests for voter registration which disenfranchised most black Americans in the state. Exclusion from voting had wide effects: it meant black Americans could not serve on juries or in any local office. After a decade of white supremacy, many people forgot North Carolina had ever had thriving middle-class black Americans. Black citizens had no political voice in the state until after the federal Civil Rights Act of 1964 and Voting Rights Act of 1965 were passed to enforce their constitutional rights. It was not until 1992 that another African American was elected as a U.S. Representative from North Carolina.

=== Early through mid-20th century ===
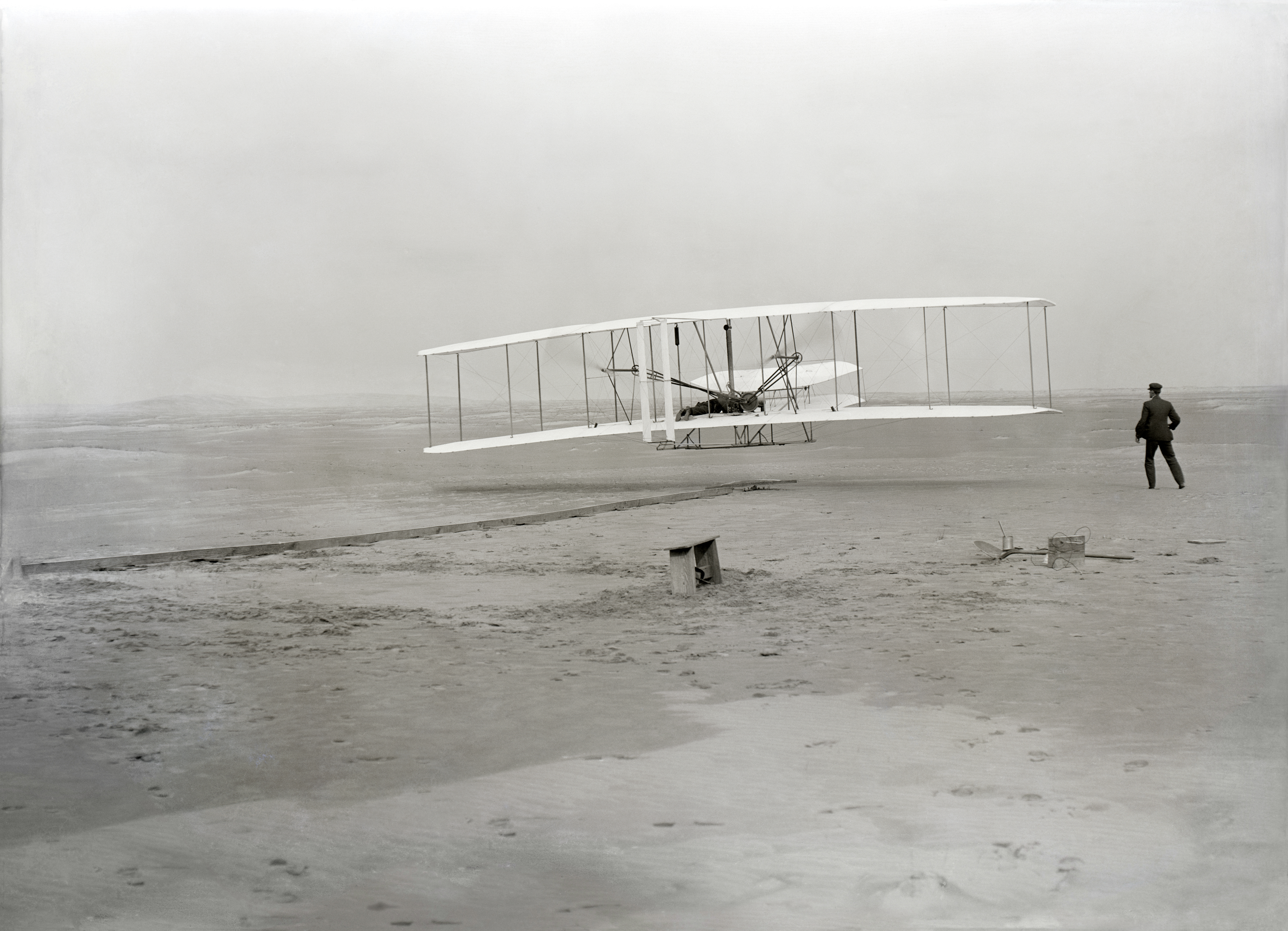
First successful flight of the Wright Flyer, near Kitty Hawk, 1903

After the reconstruction era, North Carolina had become a one-party state, dominated by the Democratic Party. The state mainly continued with an economy based on tobacco, cotton textiles and commodity agriculture. Large towns and cities remained in few numbers. However, a major industrial base emerged in the late 19th and early 20th century, in the counties of the Piedmont Triad, based on cotton mills established at the fall line. Railroads were built to connect the new industrializing cities.

The state was the site of the first successful controlled, powered and sustained heavier-than-air flight, by the Wright brothers, near Kitty Hawk on December 17, 1903.

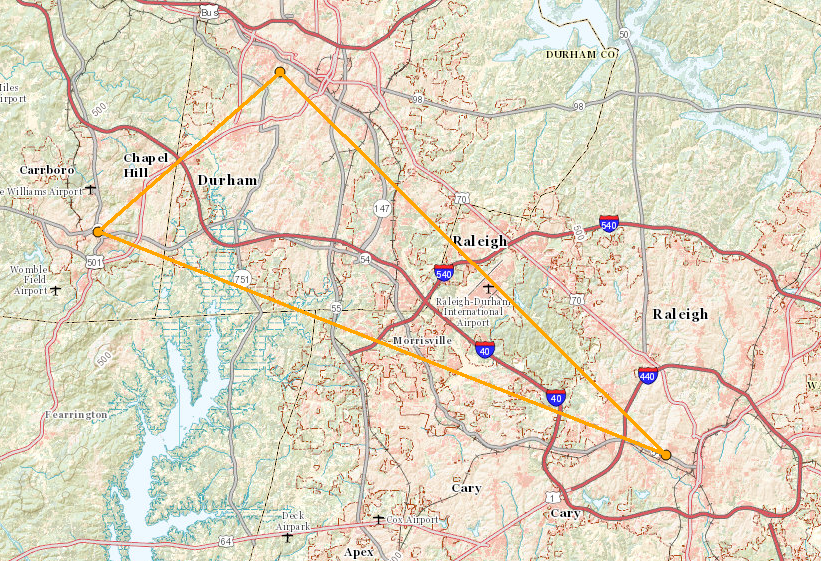
Map of Research Triangle, with points representing NC State University, Duke University, and University of North Carolina at Chapel Hill

In the first half of the 20th century, many African Americans left the state to go North for better opportunities, in the Great Migration. Their departure changed the demographic characteristics of many areas.

North Carolina was hard hit by the Great Depression, but the New Deal programs of Franklin D. Roosevelt for cotton and tobacco significantly helped the farmers. After World War II, the state's economy grew rapidly, highlighted by the growth of such cities as Charlotte, Raleigh, and Durham in the Piedmont region.

Research Triangle Park, established in 1959, serves as the largest research park in the United States. Formed near Raleigh, Durham, and Chapel Hill, the Research Triangle metro is a major area of universities and advanced scientific and technical research. By holding a 1956 meeting which helped lead to the creation of the park, Governor Luther H. Hodges launched the transformation of his state from one of the poorest in the Union to one of the most prosperous. In contrast, South Carolina's leaders lacked such vision, explaining why that state was and still is among the poorest in the country.

The Greensboro sit-ins in 1960 played a crucial role in the Civil Rights Movement to bring full equality to American blacks. By the late 1960s, spurred in part by the increasingly leftward tilt of national Democrats, conservative whites began to vote for Republican national candidates and gradually for more Republicans locally.

=== Late 20th century to present ===
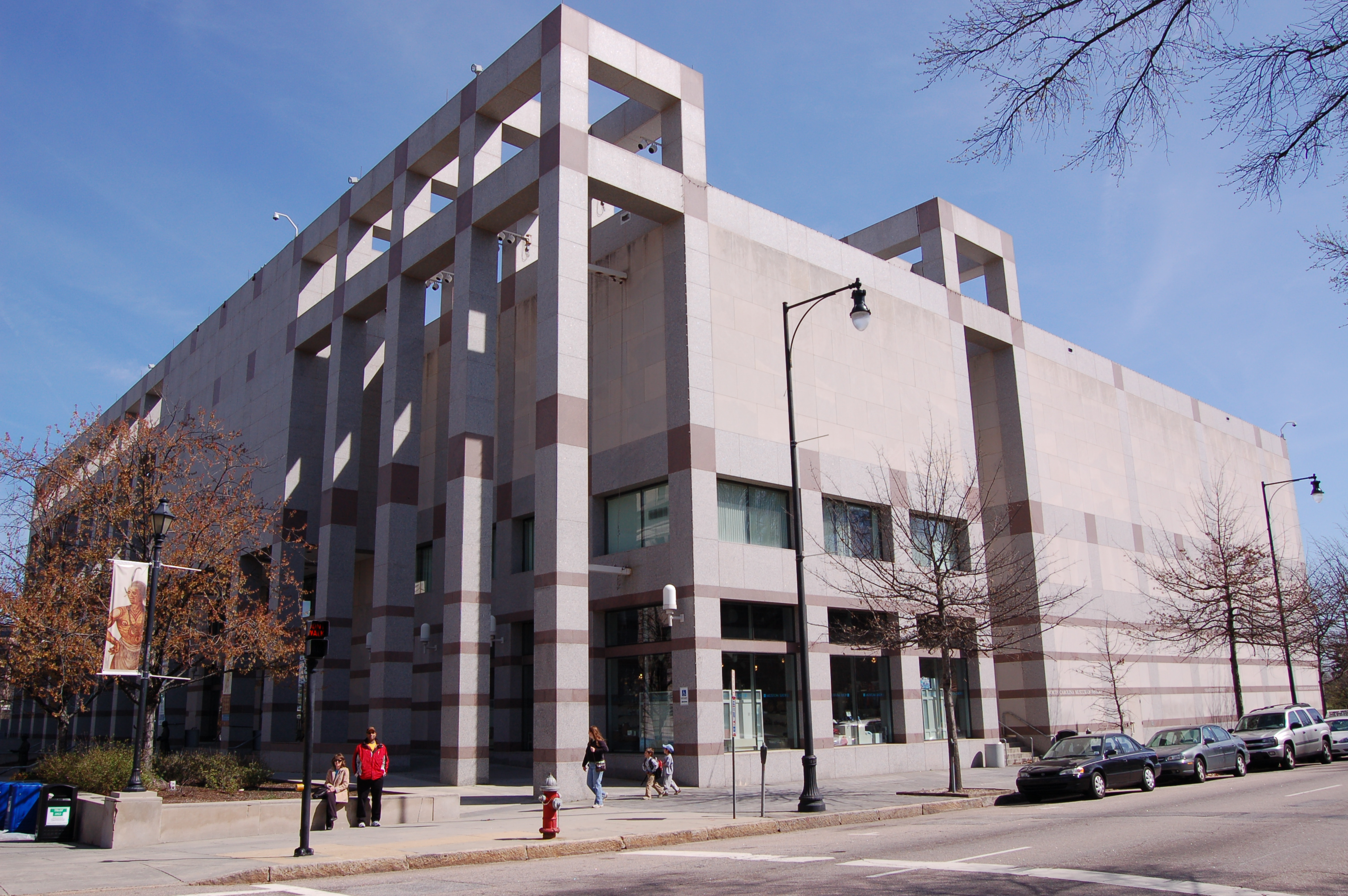
North Carolina Museum of History in Raleigh, 2008

Since the 1970s, North Carolina has seen steady increases in population growth. This growth has largely occurred in metropolitan areas located within the Piedmont Crescent, in places such as Charlotte, Concord, Greensboro, Winston-Salem, Durham and Raleigh. The Charlotte metropolitan area has experienced large growth mainly due to its finance, banking, and tech industries.

By the 1990s, Charlotte had become a major regional and national banking center. Towards Raleigh, North Carolina State, Duke University, and University of North Carolina at Chapel Hill, have helped the Research Triangle area attract an educated workforce and develop more jobs.

In 1988, North Carolina gained its first professional sports franchise, the Charlotte Hornets of the National Basketball Association (NBA). The hornets team name stems from the American Revolutionary War, when British General Cornwallis described Charlotte as a "hornet's nest of rebellion". The Carolina Panthers of the National Football League (NFL) became based in Charlotte as well, with their first season being in 1995. The Carolina Hurricanes of the National Hockey League (NHL) moved to Raleigh in 1997, with their colors being the same as the NC State Wolfpack, who are also located in Raleigh.

By the late 20th century and into the early 21st century, economic industries such as technology, pharmaceuticals, banking, food processing, vehicle parts, and tourism started to emerge as North Carolina's main economic drivers. This marked a shift from the state's former main industries of tobacco, textiles, and furniture. Factors that played a role in this shift were globalization, the state's higher education system, national banking, the transformation of agriculture, and new companies moving to the state.

== Geography ==
Interactive map of North Carolina

North Carolina municipalities

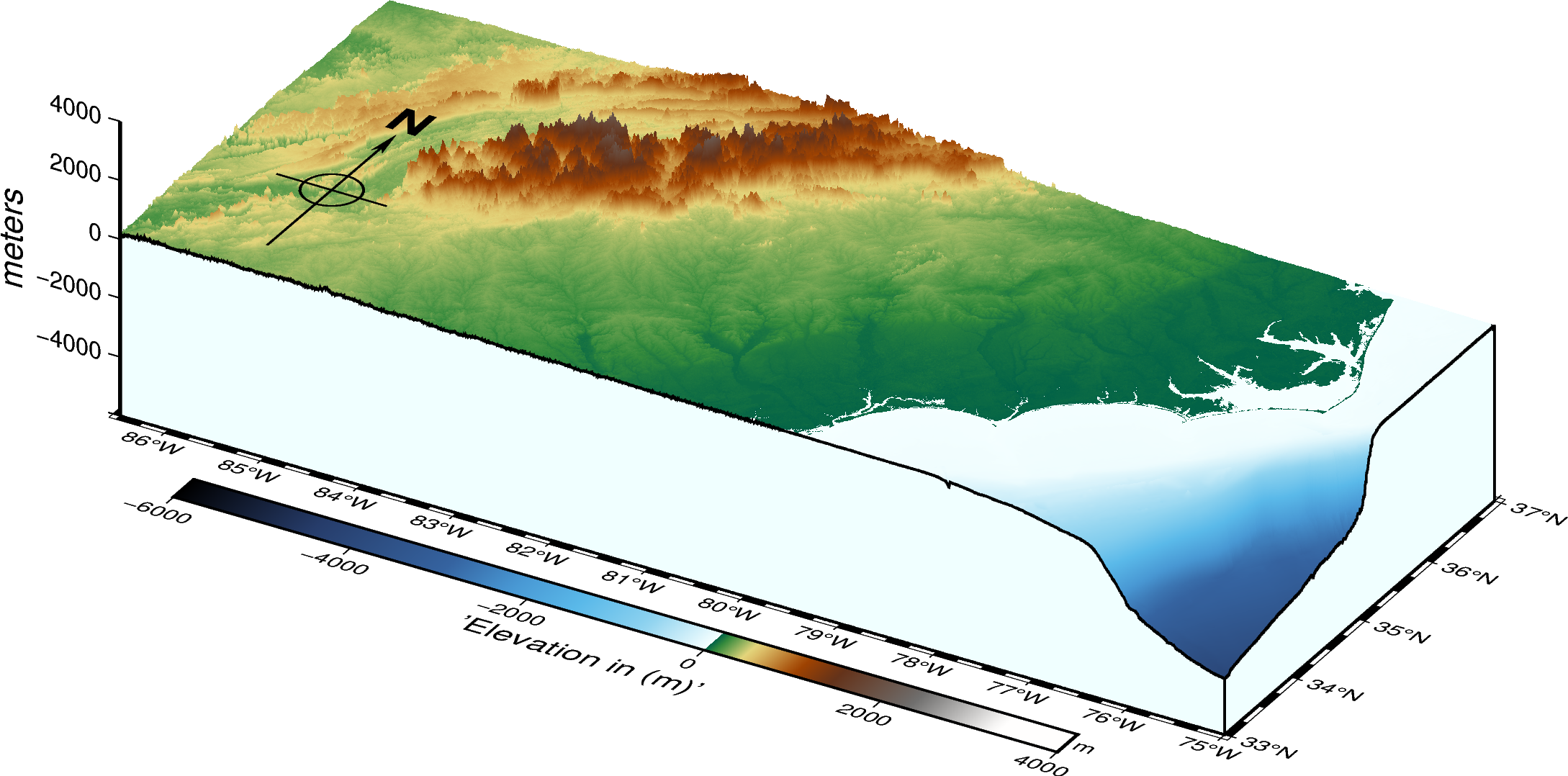
3D Topographical Map of North Carolina

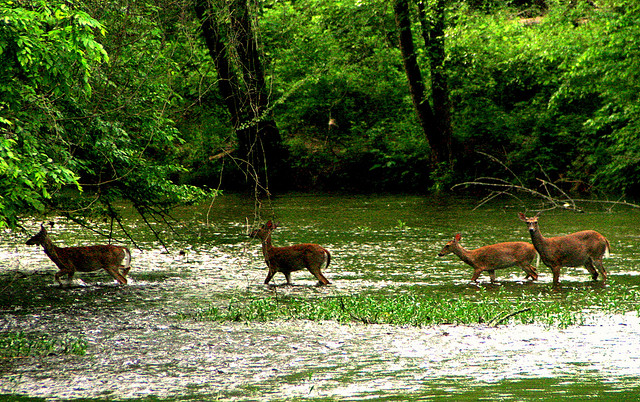
Deer in the Eno River as it flows through the Piedmont region of North Carolina

Köppen climate types of North Carolina

North Carolina is bordered by South Carolina to the south, Georgia to the southwest, Tennessee to the west, Virginia to the north, and the Atlantic Ocean to the east. The United States Census Bureau places North Carolina in the South Atlantic division of the southern region. It has a total area of 53,819.16 square miles (139,391.0 km^{2}), of which 48,617.91 square miles (125,919.8 km^{2}) is land and 5,201.25 square miles (13,471.2 km^{2}) (9.66%) is water.

North Carolina consists of three main geographic regions: the Atlantic coastal plain, occupying the eastern portion of the state; the central Piedmont region, and the mountain region in the west, which is part of the Appalachian Mountains. The coastal plain consists of more specifically defined areas known as the Outer Banks, a string of sandy, narrow barrier islands separated from the mainland by sounds or inlets, including Albemarle Sound and Pamlico Sound, the native home of the venus flytrap, and the inner coastal plain, where longleaf pine trees are native.

So many ships have been lost off Cape Hatteras that the area is known as the "Graveyard of the Atlantic"; more than a thousand ships have sunk in these waters since records began in 1526. The most famous of these is the Queen Anne's Revenge (flagship of the pirate Blackbeard), which went aground in Beaufort Inlet in 1718.

The coastal plain transitions to the Piedmont region along the Atlantic Seaboard fall line, the elevation at which waterfalls first appear on streams and rivers. The Piedmont region of central North Carolina is the state's most populous region, containing the six largest cities in the state by population. It consists of gently rolling countryside frequently broken by hills or low mountain ridges. Small, isolated, and deeply eroded mountain ranges and peaks are located in the Piedmont, including the Sauratown Mountains, Pilot Mountain, the Uwharrie Mountains, Crowder's Mountain, King's Pinnacle, the Brushy Mountains, and the South Mountains. The Piedmont ranges from about 300 feet (100 m) in elevation in the east to about 1,500 feet (500 m) in the west.

The western section of the state is part of the Blue Ridge Mountains of the larger Appalachian Mountain range. Among the subranges of the Blue Ridge Mountains located in the state are the Great Smoky Mountains and the Black Mountains. The Black Mountains are the highest in the eastern United States, and culminate in Mount Mitchell at 6,684 feet (2,037 m), the highest point east of the Mississippi River.

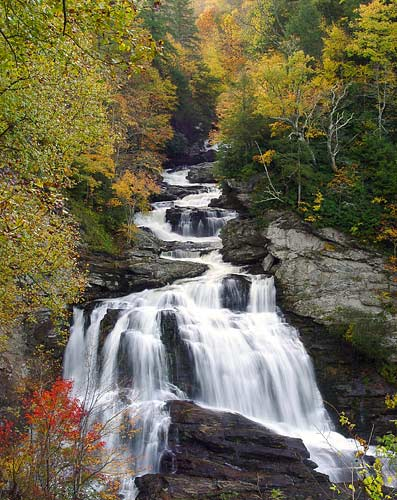
Cullasaja Falls in Macon County

North Carolina has 17 major river basins. The five basins west of the Blue Ridge Mountains flow to the Gulf of Mexico, while the remainder flow to the Atlantic Ocean. Of the 17 basins, 11 originate within the state of North Carolina, but only four are contained entirely within the state's border—the Cape Fear, the Neuse, the White Oak, and the Tar–Pamlico basin.

=== Climate ===
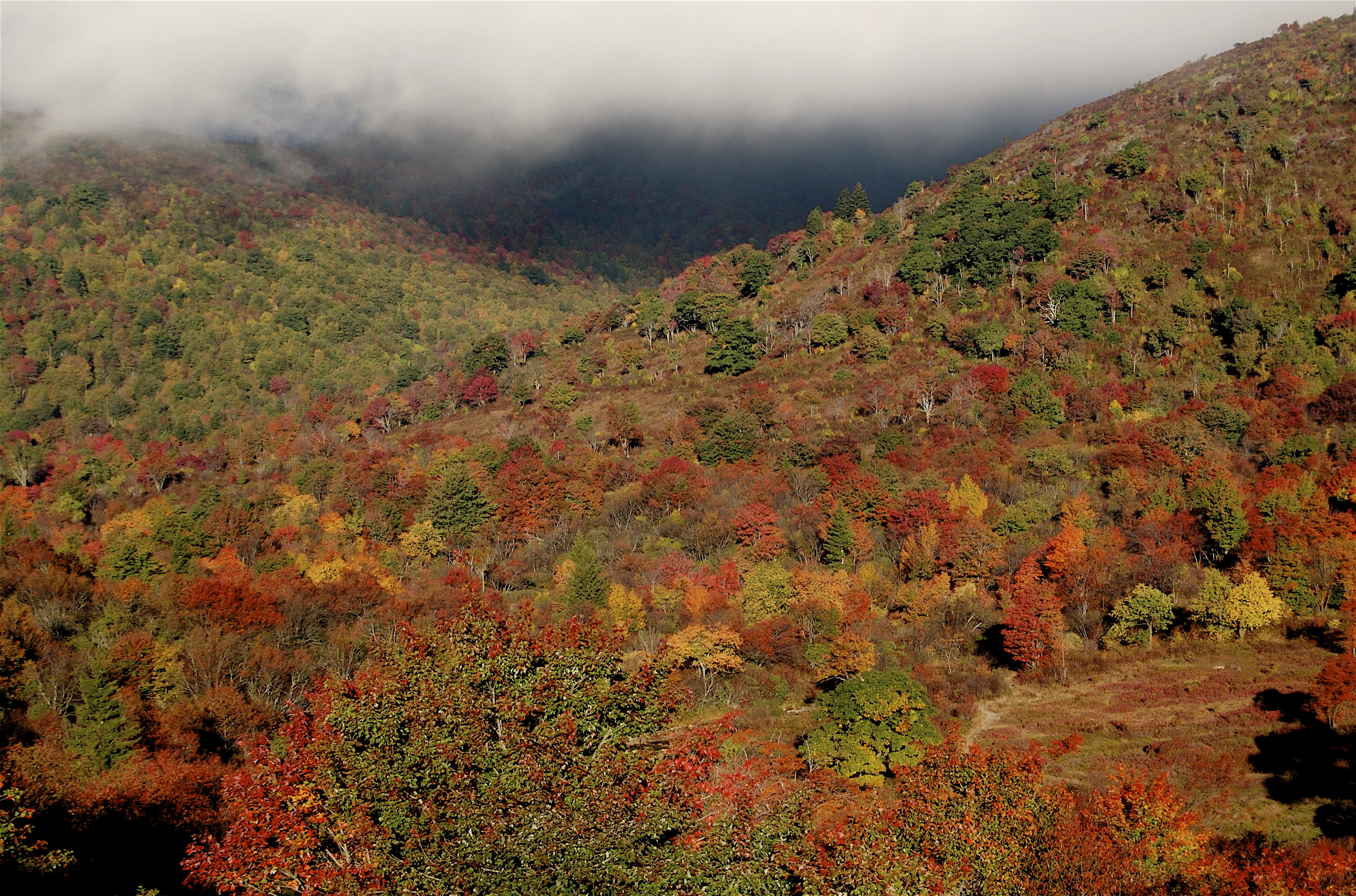
Graveyard Fields in the fall

Elevation above sea level is most responsible for temperature change across the state, with the mountainous regions being coolest year-round. The climate is also influenced by the Atlantic Ocean and the Gulf Stream, especially in the coastal plain. These influences tend to cause warmer winter temperatures along the coast, where temperatures only occasionally drop below the freezing point at night. The coastal plain averages around 1 inch (2.5 cm) of snow or ice annually, and in many years, there may be no snow or ice at all.

The Atlantic Ocean exerts less influence on the climate of the Piedmont region, which has hotter summers and colder winters than along the coast, though winters are still mild.

North Carolina experiences severe weather both in summer and in winter, with summer bringing threat of hurricanes, tropical storms, heavy rain, and flooding. Destructive hurricanes that have hit North Carolina include Hurricane Fran, Hurricane Florence, Hurricane Floyd, Hurricane Hugo, and Hurricane Hazel, the latter being the strongest storm ever to make landfall in the state, as a Category 4 in 1954. Hurricane Helene ranks as the most destructive of the 21st century.

North Carolina averages fewer than 20 tornadoes per year, many of them produced by hurricanes or tropical storms along the coastal plain. Tornadoes from thunderstorms are a risk, especially in the eastern part of the state. The western Piedmont is often protected by the mountains, which tend to break up storms as they cross over; the storms will often re-form farther east. A phenomenon known as "cold-air damming" often occurs in the northwestern part of the state, which can weaken storms but can also lead to major ice events in winter.

In April 2011, the worst tornado outbreak in North Carolina's history occurred. Thirty confirmed tornadoes touched down, mainly in the Eastern Piedmont and Sandhills, killing at least 24 people. In September 2019 Hurricane Dorian hit the area.

Monthly normal high and low temperatures (Fahrenheit) for various North Carolina cities.
City	Jan	Feb	Mar	Apr	May	Jun	Jul	Aug	Sep	Oct	Nov	Dec
Asheville	47/27	51/30	59/35	68/43	75/51	81/60	84/64	83/63	77/56	68/45	59/36	49/29
Boone	42/21	45/23	52/29	61/37	69/46	76/54	79/58	78/57	72/50	63/39	54/31	45/24
Cape Hatteras	52/39	54/40	59/45	66/53	74/61	81/69	85/74	84/73	80/69	72/60	64/51	56/43
Charlotte	51/30	55/33	63/39	72/47	79/56	86/64	89/68	88/67	81/60	72/49	62/39	53/32
Fayetteville	54/33	59/35	66/42	75/50	82/59	89/68	91/72	90/70	84/64	75/52	67/43	56/35
Greensboro	48/30	53/32	61/39	70/47	78/56	85/65	88/69	86/68	80/61	70/49	61/40	51/32
Raleigh	51/31	55/34	63/40	72/48	80/57	87/66	90/70	88/69	82/62	73/50	64/41	54/33
Wilmington	56/36	60/38	66/44	74/52	81/60	87/69	90/73	88/71	84/66	76/55	68/45	59/38

Climate data for North Carolina
Month	Jan	Feb	Mar	Apr	May	Jun	Jul	Aug	Sep	Oct	Nov	Dec	Year
Record high °F (°C)	86 (30)	90 (32)	100 (38)	102 (39)	107 (42)	108 (42)	109 (43)	110 (43)	109 (43)	102 (39)	90 (32)	87 (31)	110 (43)
Mean daily maximum °F (°C)	49.9 (9.9)	53.7 (12.1)	61.8 (16.6)	71.0 (21.7)	78.1 (25.6)	85.2 (29.6)	88.1 (31.2)	86.8 (30.4)	80.8 (27.1)	71.6 (22.0)	62.5 (16.9)	52.5 (11.4)	70.2 (21.2)
Daily mean °F (°C)	39.2 (4.0)	42.3 (5.7)	49.5 (9.7)	58.1 (14.5)	66.1 (18.9)	74.1 (23.4)	77.5 (25.3)	76.3 (24.6)	69.9 (21.1)	59.4 (15.2)	50.4 (10.2)	41.7 (5.4)	58.7 (14.8)
Mean daily minimum °F (°C)	28.4 (−2.0)	30.9 (−0.6)	37.2 (2.9)	45.2 (7.3)	54.0 (12.2)	63.0 (17.2)	66.8 (19.3)	65.8 (18.8)	58.9 (14.9)	47.2 (8.4)	38.3 (3.5)	30.8 (−0.7)	47.2 (8.4)
Record low °F (°C)	−34 (−37)	−31 (−35)	−29 (−34)	0 (−18)	13 (−11)	22 (−6)	30 (−1)	29 (−2)	23 (−5)	5 (−15)	−22 (−30)	−33 (−36)	−34 (−37)
Average precipitation inches (mm)	3.7 (94)	3.5 (89)	4.2 (110)	3.5 (89)	3.8 (97)	4.3 (110)	4.8 (120)	4.7 (120)	4.3 (110)	3.3 (84)	3.3 (84)	3.5 (89)	46.9 (1,196)
Average snowfall inches (cm)	2.0 (5.1)	1.4 (3.6)	0.6 (1.5)	0.1 (0.25)	0.0 (0.0)	0.0 (0.0)	0.0 (0.0)	0.0 (0.0)	0.0 (0.0)	0.0 (0.0)	0.1 (0.25)	0.8 (2.0)	5 (12.7)
Source 1: USA.com (averages)
Source 2: North Carolina State Climate Office (extremes)

=== Parks and recreation ===
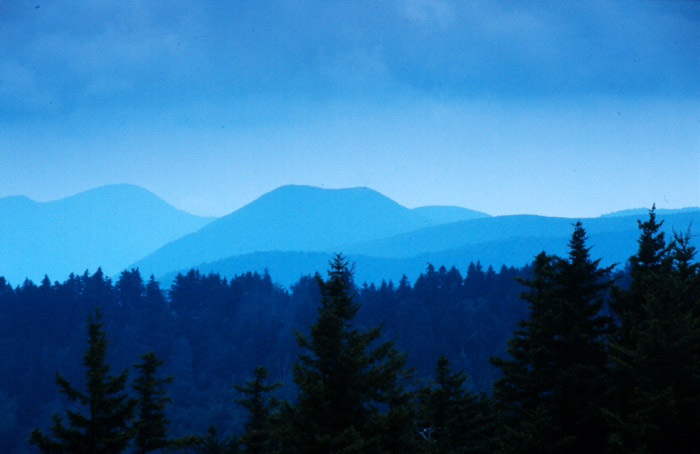
The Blue Ridge Mountains of the Shining Rock Wilderness Area

North Carolina provides a large range of recreational activities, from swimming at the beach to skiing in the mountains. North Carolina offers fall colors, freshwater and saltwater fishing, hunting, birdwatching, agritourism, ATV trails, ballooning, rock climbing, biking, hiking, skiing, boating and sailing, camping, canoeing, caving (spelunking), gardens, and arboretums. North Carolina has theme parks, aquariums, museums, historic sites, lighthouses, elegant theaters, concert halls, and fine dining.

North Carolinians enjoy outdoor recreation using numerous local bike paths, 34 state parks, and 14 national parks. National Park Service units include the Appalachian National Scenic Trail, the Blue Ridge Parkway, Cape Hatteras National Seashore, Cape Lookout National Seashore, Carl Sandburg Home National Historic Site at Flat Rock, Fort Raleigh National Historic Site at Manteo, Great Smoky Mountains National Park, Great Smoky Mountains Railroad, Guilford Courthouse National Military Park in Greensboro, Moores Creek National Battlefield near Currie in Pender County, the Overmountain Victory National Historic Trail, Old Salem National Historic Site in Winston-Salem, the Trail of Tears National Historic Trail, and Wright Brothers National Memorial in Kill Devil Hills.

National forests include Uwharrie National Forest in central North Carolina, Croatan National Forest in Eastern North Carolina, Pisgah National Forest in the western mountains, and Nantahala National Forest in the southwestern part of the state.

=== Major cities ===
In 2024, the U.S. Census Bureau released the 2023 population estimates for municipalities in North Carolina. Charlotte has the largest population, while Raleigh has the second-largest population in North Carolina.

Largest cities or towns in North Carolina (2023 census estimate)
Rank	Name	County	Pop.	Rank	Name	County	Pop.
1	Charlotte	Mecklenburg	911,311	11	Asheville	Buncombe	95,056
2	Raleigh	Wake	482,295	12	Greenville	Pitt	90,053
3	Greensboro	Guilford	302,296	13	Gastonia	Gaston	83,942
4	Durham	Durham	296,186	14	Jacksonville	Onslow	72,879
5	Winston-Salem	Forsyth	252,975	15	Apex	Wake	72,225
6	Fayetteville	Cumberland	209,749	16	Huntersville	Mecklenburg	64,688
7	Cary	Wake	180,010	17	Chapel Hill	Orange	62,043
8	Wilmington	New Hanover	122,698	18	Burlington	Alamance	60,032
9	High Point	Guilford	116,926	19	Kannapolis	Cabarrus	59,321
10	Concord	Cabarrus	110,119	20	Wake Forest	Wake	54,337

=== Most populous counties ===
After the 2020 census, Wake County—with a population of 1,129,410—became the most populous county in the state, overtaking Mecklenburg County—with a population of 1,115,482—by a margin of about 14,000. Both counties are still the only to have populations over one million in North Carolina and the Carolinas region.

=== Statistical areas ===
North Carolina has four major combined statistical areas (CSA) with a population over 1 million (as of 2023):

- Charlotte Metro: Charlotte-Concord, NC-SC; population 3,471,190
- Research Triangle: Raleigh-Durham-Cary, NC; population: 2,439,501
- Hampton Roads: Virginia Beach-Chesapeake, VA-NC; population: 1,873,879
- Piedmont Triad: Greensboro–Winston-Salem–High Point, NC; population: 1,760,496

== Demographics ==
Historical population
Census	Pop.	Note	%±
1790	393,751		—
1800	478,103		21.4%
1810	556,526		16.4%
1820	638,829		14.8%
1830	737,987		15.5%
1840	753,419		2.1%
1850	869,039		15.3%
1860	992,622		14.2%
1870	1,071,361		7.9%
1880	1,399,750		30.7%
1890	1,617,949		15.6%
1900	1,893,810		17.1%
1910	2,206,287		16.5%
1920	2,559,123		16.0%
1930	3,170,276		23.9%
1940	3,571,623		12.7%
1950	4,061,929		13.7%
1960	4,556,155		12.2%
1970	5,082,059		11.5%
1980	5,881,766		15.7%
1990	6,628,637		12.7%
2000	8,049,313		21.4%
2010	9,535,483		18.5%
2020	10,439,388		9.5%
2025 (est.)	11,197,968		7.3%
Source: 1910–2020

The United States Census Bureau determined the population of North Carolina was 10,439,388 at the 2020 census. Based on numbers in 2012 of the people residing in North Carolina 58.5% were born there; 33.1% were born in another state; 1.0% were born in Puerto Rico, U.S. island areas, or born abroad to American parent(s); and 7.4% were foreign-born. Between 2021 and 2024, the state's population increased from 10,551,162 to 11,046,024. North Carolina recorded the fourth-largest population gain nationally between 2023 and 2024, and it remains the ninth-most populous state in the country.

State population estimates indicate notable age-structure shifts between 2021 and 2024. The population of young children increased modestly, with 604,897 residents aged 0–4 in 2024 compared with 582,801 in 2021. School-aged cohorts also grew, including 648,697 individuals aged 5–9 and 665,306 aged 10–14. Adolescents and young adults remained a sizable demographic, with 730,298 residents aged 15–19 and 750,306 residents aged 20–24 recorded in 2024. Working-age adults constitute the state's largest population groups. In 2024, the 30-34 age group contained 764,029 residents, followed by 735,094 aged 35–39. Older adults represent a growing proportion of the state. Individuals aged 70–74 rose from 516,446 to 532,540 in 2024, while the 75-79 population increased substantially from 326,449 to 394,209 across the same period. The number of residents aged 85 and older also grew, reaching 181,248 in 2024.

Statistics show that annual births have remained stable, but slightly declining over the past decade. Births decreased from 122,302 in 2010 to 118,292 in 2023. Deaths increased from 78,604 in 2010 to 118,040 in 2021 during the COVID-19 pandemic before declining to 104,855 in 2023. Since 2022, annual births have averaged around 121,000, while deaths have remained near 109,000, resulting in a modest natural increase. This natural increase added approximately 12,000 residents between July 2023 and July 2024, accounting for 8% of total population growth during that period.

Migration is the primary factor driving recent population change. Between April 2020 and July 2024, North Carolina gained an estimated 573,000 residents through net migration, representing 95% of total population growth of that period. Domestic migration continues to account for the majority of this increase. Between July 2023 and July 2024, the state gained 82,000 residents through net state-to-state migration, the second-highest figure in the nation after Texas. International migration, which declined sharply during the height of the COVID-19 pandemic, has rebounded. While it represented less than 10% of net migration in 2020–2021, it accounted for 46% of net migration in 2023–2024, with 70,000 net international arrivals during the year.

Population growth is heavily concentrated in the state's largest metropolitan counties. In 2020, Wake County reported 1,135,576 residents, and Mecklenburg County reported 1,118,967, making them the two most populous counties in North Carolina.

According to HUD's 2022 Annual Homeless Assessment Report, there were an estimated 9,382 homeless people in North Carolina.

The top countries of origin for North Carolina's immigrants were Mexico, India, Honduras, China and El Salvador, as of 2018.

=== Race and ethnicity ===
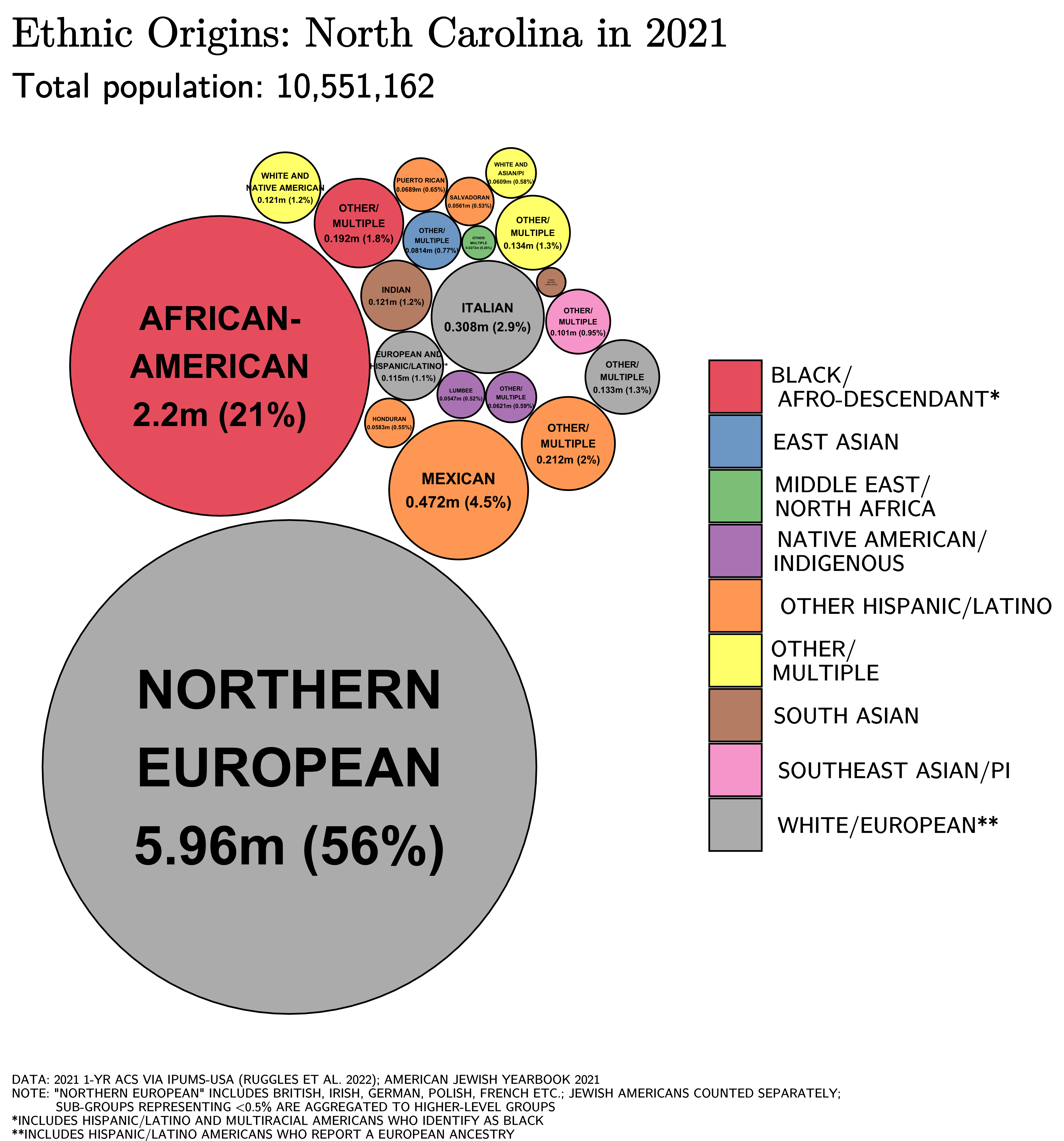
Ethnic origins in North Carolina

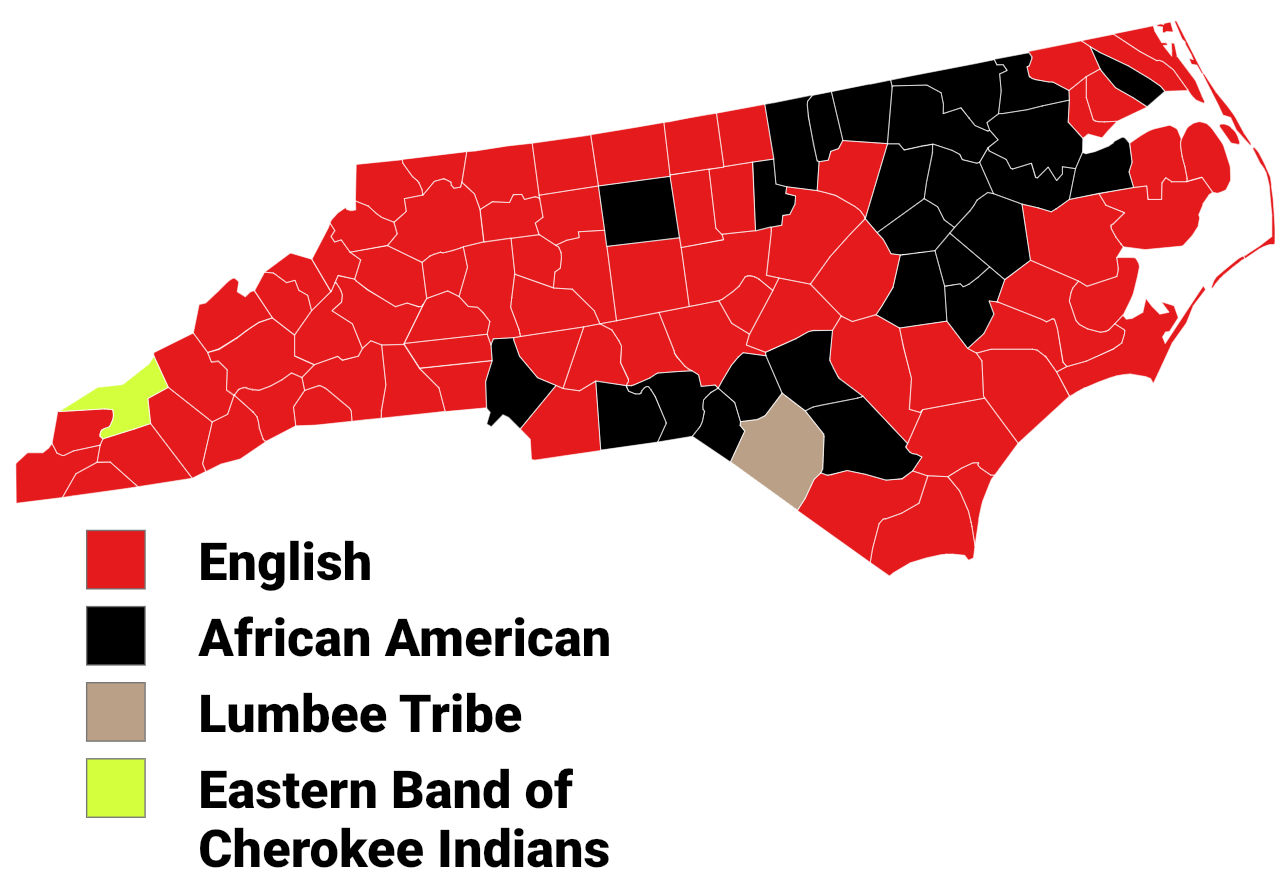
Largest alone or in any combination ethnic origin by county in North Carolina, per the 2020 census

Ethnic composition as of the 2020 census
Race and Ethnicity	Alone	Total
White (non-Hispanic)	60.5%	63.9%
African American (non-Hispanic)	20.2%	21.8%
Hispanic or Latino (Note: Persons of Hispanic or Latino origin are not distinguished between total and partial ancestry.)	—	10.7%
Asian	3.3%	4.0%
Native American	1.0%	2.5%
Pacific Islander	0.1%	0.2%
Other	0.4%	1.1%

Historical racial demographics
Racial composition	1990	2000	2010	2020
White	75.6%	72.1%	68.5%	62.2%
Black	22.0%	21.6%	21.4%	20.5%
Asian	0.8%	1.4%	2.2%	3.3%
Native	1.2%	1.2%	1.3%	1.2%
Native Hawaiian and other Pacific Islander	–	0.1%	0.1%	0.1%
Other race	0.5%	2.3%	4.3%	5.9%
Two or more races	–	1.3%	2.3%	6.8%

North Carolina – Racial and ethnic composition Note: the US Census treats Hispanic/Latino as an ethnic category. This table excludes Latinos from the racial categories and assigns them to a separate category. Hispanics/Latinos may be of any race.
Race / Ethnicity (NH = Non-Hispanic)	Pop 1980	Pop 1990	Pop 2000	Pop 2010	Pop 2020	% 1980	% 1990	% 2000	% 2010	% 2020
White alone (NH)	4,428,562	4,971,127	5,647,155	6,223,995	6,312,148	75.29%	74.99%	70.16%	65.27%	60.46%
Black or African American alone (NH)	1,304,563	1,449,142	1,723,301	2,019,854	2,107,526	22.18%	21.86%	21.41%	21.18%	20.19%
Native American or Alaska Native alone (NH)	63,797	78,930	95,333	108,829	100,886	1.08%	1.19%	1.18%	1.14%	0.97%
Asian alone (NH)	21,153	50,593	112,416	206,579	340,059	0.36%	0.76%	1.40%	2.17%	3.26%
Native Hawaiian or Pacific Islander alone (NH)	x	x	3,165	5,259	6,980	x	x	0.04%	0.06%	0.07%
Other race alone (NH)	7,024	2,119	9,015	15,088	46,340	0.12%	0.03%	0.11%	0.16%	0.44%
Mixed race or Multiracial (NH)	x	x	79,965	155,759	406,853	x	x	0.99%	1.63%	3.90%
Hispanic or Latino (any race)	56,667	76,726	378,963	800,120	1,118,596	0.96%	1.16%	4.71%	8.39%	10.72%
Total	5,881,766	6,628,637	8,049,313	9,535,483	10,439,388	100.00%	100.00%	100.00%	100.00%	100.00%

Map of counties in North Carolina by racial plurality, per the 2020 U.S. census Legend: | Non-Hispanic White 30–40% 40–50% 50–60% 60–70% 70–80% 80–90% 90%+ | Black or African American 40–50% 50–60% 60–70% | Native American 40–50% |

At the 2010 census, the racial composition of North Carolina was: White: 68.5% (65.3% non-Hispanic white, 3.2% White Hispanic), Black or African American: 21.5%, Latin and Hispanic American of any race: 8.4%, some other race: 4.3%, Multiracial American: 2.2%, Asian American: 2.2%, and Native Hawaiian and Pacific Islander: 1%. In 2020, North Carolina like much of the U.S. experienced a decline in its non-Hispanic white population; at the 2020 census, non-Hispanic whites were 62.2%, Blacks or African Americans 20.5%, American Indian and Alaska Natives 1.2%, Asians 3.3%, Native Hawaiian and other Pacific Islanders 0.1%, people from other race 5.9%, and multiracial Americans 6.8%.

The majority of the Black American population is concentrated in the urban areas and northeastern part of the state.

North Carolina's Hispanic population has grown rapidly. The Hispanic population more than doubled in size between 1990 and 2000. Many of North Carolina's Hispanic residents are of Mexican descent. Many of North Carolina's newer Latino residents came from Mexico largely to work in agriculture, manufacturing, or on one of North Carolina's military installations.

The most common ancestries in North Carolina are African-American, American, German, English, and Irish.

North Carolina has the eighth-largest Native American population in the country. The state is home to eight Native American tribes and four urban Native American organizations.

==== 2025 American Community Survey one-year estimates ====
Racial Makeup of North Carolina (2025): 1. White alone (59.7%); 2. Black alone (19.5%); 3. Native American alone (1.54%); 4. Asian Alone (3.97%); 5. Pacific Islander Alone (0.08%); 6. Other race alone (5.86%); 7. Two or more races (9.31%)	Racial/Ethnic Makeup of North Carolina excluding Hispanics from racial categories (2025); NH=Non-Hispanic: 1. White NH (57.8%); 2. Black NH (19.2%); 3. Native American NH (1.00%); 4. Asian NH (3.93%); 5. Pacific Islander NH (0.06%); 6. Other race NH (0.51%); 7. Two or more races NH (4.89%); 8. Hispanic Any Race (12.6%)	Racial Makeup of Hispanics in North Carolina (2025): 1. White alone (15.2%); 2. Black alone (2.35%); 3. Native American alone (4.26%); 4. Asian Alone (0.28%); 5. Pacific Islander Alone (0.12%); 6. Other race alone (42.6%); 7. Two or more races (35.2%)

=== Languages ===
Most common languages other than English spoken in North Carolina
Language	Percentage of population (in 2010)
Spanish	6.93%
French	0.32%
German	0.27%
Chinese (including Mandarin)	0.27%
Vietnamese	0.24%
Arabic	0.17%
Korean	0.16%
Tagalog	0.13%
Hindi	0.12%
Gujarati, Russian, and Hmong (tied)	0.11%
Italian and Japanese (tied)	0.08%
Cherokee	0.01%

North Carolina is home to a spectrum of different dialects of Southern American English and Appalachian English.

In 2010, 89.66% (7,750,904) of North Carolina residents age five and older spoke English at home as a primary language, while 6.93% (598,756) spoke Spanish, 0.32% (27,310) French, 0.27% (23,204) German, and Chinese (which includes Mandarin) was spoken as a main language by 0.27% (23,072) of the population five and older. In total, 10.34% (893,735) of North Carolina's population age five and older spoke a mother language other than English. In 2019, 87.7% of the population aged 5 and older spoke English and 12.3% spoke another language. The most common non-English language was Spanish at the 2019 American Community Survey.

=== Religion ===
Religion in North Carolina (2014)
Religion	Percent
Evangelical Protestant	35%
Unaffiliated	20%
Mainline Protestant	19%
Historically Black Protestant	12%
Catholic	9%
Mormon	1%
Eastern Orthodox	1%
Jehovah's Witness	1%
Jewish	1%
Other faith	1%

North Carolina residents since the colonial era have historically been overwhelmingly Protestant—first Anglican, then Baptist and Methodist. In 2010, the Southern Baptist Convention was the single largest Christian denomination, with 4,241 churches and 1,513,000 members. The second largest in 2024 was the Catholic Church which is organised into two dioceses. In the west is the Diocese of Charlotte which includes Charlotte and has 530,000 members in 196 parishes. In the east is the Diocese of Raleigh with a total of 80 parishes and nearly 500,000 Catholics. The third largest was the United Methodist Church, with 660,000 members and 1,923 churches. The fourth largest was the Presbyterian Church (USA), with 186,000 members and 710 congregations; this denomination was brought by Scots-Irish immigrants who settled the backcountry in the colonial era. In 2020, the Southern Baptists remained the largest with 1,324,747 adherents, though Methodists and others were collectively overtaken by non/interdenominational Protestants numbering 1,053,564.

In 1845, the Baptists split into regional associations of the Northern United States and Southern U.S., over the issue of slavery. These new associations were the Northern Baptist Convention (today the American Baptist Churches USA) and Southern Baptist Convention. By the late 19th century, the largest Protestant denomination in North Carolina were Baptists. After emancipation, black Baptists quickly set up their own independent congregations in North Carolina and other states of the South, as they wanted to be free of white supervision. Black Baptists developed their own state and national associations, such as the National Baptist Convention. Other primarily African American Baptist conventions which grew in the state since the 20th century were the Progressive National Baptist Convention and Full Gospel Baptist Church Fellowship.

Methodists (the second-largest group among North Carolinian Protestants) were divided along racial lines in the United Methodist Church and African Methodist Episcopal Church. The Methodist tradition tends to be strong in the northern Piedmont, especially in populous Guilford County. Other prominent Protestant groups in North Carolina as of the Pew Research Center's 2014 study were non/interdenominational Protestants and Pentecostalism. The Assemblies of God and Church of God in Christ are the largest Pentecostal denominations operating in the state, while notable minorities include Oneness Pentecostals primarily affiliated with the United Pentecostal Church International.

The state also has a special history with the Moravian Church, as settlers of this faith (largely of German origin) settled in the Winston-Salem area in the 18th and 19th centuries. Historically Scots-Irish have had a strong presence in Charlotte and in Scotland County.

A wide variety of non-Christian faiths are practiced by other residents in the state, including: Judaism, Islam, Baháʼí, Buddhism, and Hinduism. The rapid influx of Northerners and immigrants from Latin America is steadily increasing ethnic and religious diversity within the state. The number of Roman Catholics and Jews in the state has increased, along with general religious diversity as a whole. There are also a substantial number of Quakers in Guilford County and northeastern North Carolina. Many universities and colleges in the state have been founded on religious traditions, and some currently maintain that affiliation, including:

- Barton College (Disciples of Christ)
- Belmont Abbey College (Catholic)
- Bennett College for Women (United Methodist Church)
- Brevard College (United Methodist Church)
- Campbell University (Baptist)
- Catawba College (United Church of Christ)
- Chowan University (Baptist)
- Davidson College (Presbyterian)
- Duke University (Historically Methodist)
- Elon University (Historically United Church of Christ)
- Gardner–Webb University (Cooperative Baptist Fellowship)
- Greensboro College (Methodist)
- Guilford College (Religious Society of Friends/Quakers)
- High Point University (United Methodist Church)
- Lees-McRae College (Presbyterian)
- Lenoir-Rhyne University (Evangelical Lutheran Church in America)
- Livingstone College (African Methodist Episcopal Zion Church)
- Louisburg College (United Methodist Church)
- Mars Hill University (Christian)
- Methodist University (United Methodist Church)
- Montreat College (Christian)
- University of Mount Olive (Baptist)
- North Carolina Wesleyan University (United Methodist Church)
- William Peace University (Presbyterian)
- Pfeiffer University (Methodist)
- Queens University of Charlotte (Presbyterian)
- St. Andrews Presbyterian College (Presbyterian)
- Saint Augustine's College (Episcopal)
- Salem College (Moravian Church)
- Shaw University (Baptist)
- Wake Forest University (Historically Baptist)
- Warren Wilson College (Historically Presbyterian)
- Wingate University (Historically Baptist)

The state also has several major seminaries, including the Southeastern Baptist Theological Seminary in Wake Forest, and the Hood Theological Seminary (AME Zion) in Salisbury.

== Economy ==
According to the U.S. Bureau of Economic Analysis, North Carolina's gross state product was $893.762 billion and its per capita personal income was $68,511 in 2025. Based on American Community Survey 2010–2014 data, North Carolina's median household income was $46,693. It ranked forty-first out of fifty states plus the District of Columbia for median household income. North Carolina had the fourteenth highest poverty rate in the nation at 17.6%, with 13% of families that were below the poverty line. As of May 2025, the unemployment rate was 3.7%.

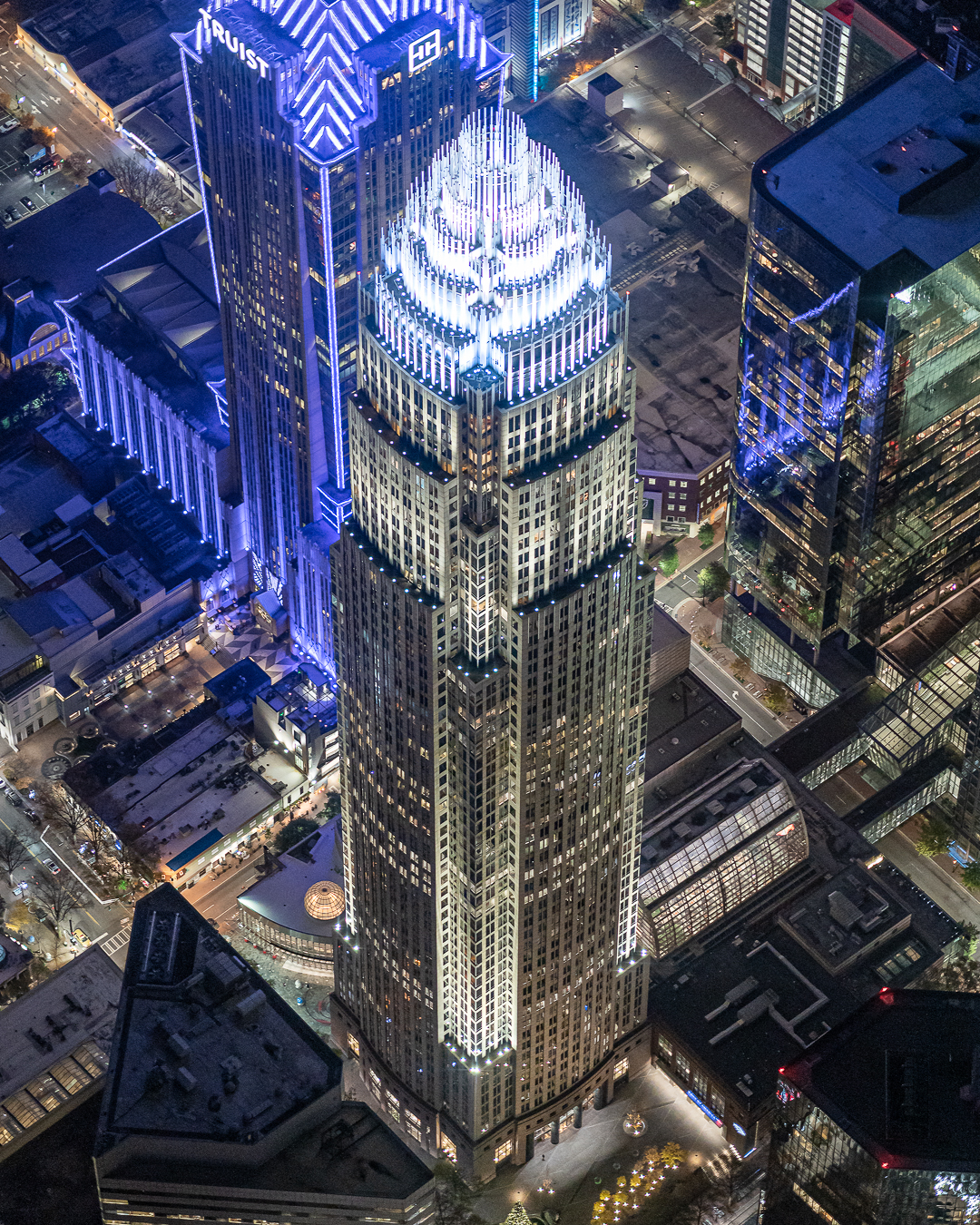
Charlotte is home to the headquarters of Bank of America (foreground) and Truist (background), two of the largest banks in the United States. Bank of America is the largest company headquartered in North Carolina.

The state has a very diverse economy because of its great availability of hydroelectric power, its pleasant climate, and its wide variety of soils. The state ranks third among the South Atlantic states in population, but leads the region in industry and agriculture. North Carolina leads the nation in the production of tobacco.

Charlotte, the state's largest city, is a major textile and trade center. According to a Forbes article written in 2013, employment in the "Old North State" has gained many different industry sectors. Science, technology, engineering, and math (STEM) industries in the area surrounding North Carolina's capital have grown 17.9 percent since 2001. Raleigh ranked the third best city for technology in 2020 due to the state's growing technology sector. In 2010, North Carolina's total gross state product was $424.9 billion, while the state debt in November 2012, according to one source, totaled $2.4 billion, while according to another in 2012 it was $57.8 billion.

In 2025, 99.6% of North Carolina businesses were small businesses and employed 1.8 million people, or 44.2% of the state's work force.

North Carolina is the leading U.S. state in production of flue-cured tobacco and sweet potatoes, and comes second in the farming of pigs and hogs, trout, and turkeys. In the three most recent USDA surveys (2002, 2007, 2012), North Carolina also ranked second in the production of Christmas trees.

North Carolina has 15 metropolitan areas, and was chosen as the third-best state by Forbes Magazine in 2010 and the second-best state by Chief Executive Magazine in 2011 for business. Since 2000, there has been a clear division in the economic growth of North Carolina's urban and rural areas. While North Carolina's urban areas have enjoyed a prosperous economy with steady job growth, low unemployment, and rising wages, many of the state's rural counties have suffered from job loss, rising levels of poverty, and population loss as their manufacturing base has declined. According to one estimate, one-half of North Carolina's 100 counties have lost population since 2010, primarily due to the poor economy in many of North Carolina's rural areas. However, the population of the state's urban areas is steadily increasing. In 2025, CNBC ranked North Carolina as America's number one state for business based on factors such as workforce, business friendliness, and economy, among others.

== Arts and culture ==
In my mind, I'm goin' to Carolina

Can't you see the sunshine?

Now can't you just feel the moonshine?

And ain't it just like a friend of mine to hit me from behind?

Yes, I'm goin' to Carolina in my mind

— James Taylor, "Carolina In My Mind"

North Carolina has traditions in art, music, and cuisine. The nonprofit arts and culture industry generates $1.2 billion in direct economic activity in North Carolina, supporting more than 43,600 full-time equivalent jobs and generating $119 million in revenue for local governments and the state of North Carolina. North Carolina established the North Carolina Museum of Art as the first major museum collection in the country to be formed by state legislation and funding and continues to bring millions into the NC economy.

One of the more famous arts communities in the state is Seagrove, the handmade-pottery capital of the U.S., where artisans create handcrafted pottery inspired by the same traditions that began in this community more than two hundred years ago.

=== Internet ===
MrBeast (Jimmy Donaldson), the most subscribed individual on YouTube since 2024, hails from Greenville.

Good Mythical Morning co-hosts Rhett McLaughlin and Link Neal were raised in Buies Creek, a small community in Harnett County.

=== Music ===
North Carolina boasts a large number of noteworthy jazz musicians, some among the most important in the history of the genre. These include: John Coltrane, (Hamlet, High Point); Thelonious Monk (Rocky Mount); Billy Taylor (Greenville); Woody Shaw (Laurinburg); Lou Donaldson (Durham); Max Roach (Newland); Tal Farlow (Greensboro); Albert, Jimmy and Percy Heath (Wilmington); Nina Simone (Tryon); and Billy Strayhorn (Hillsborough).

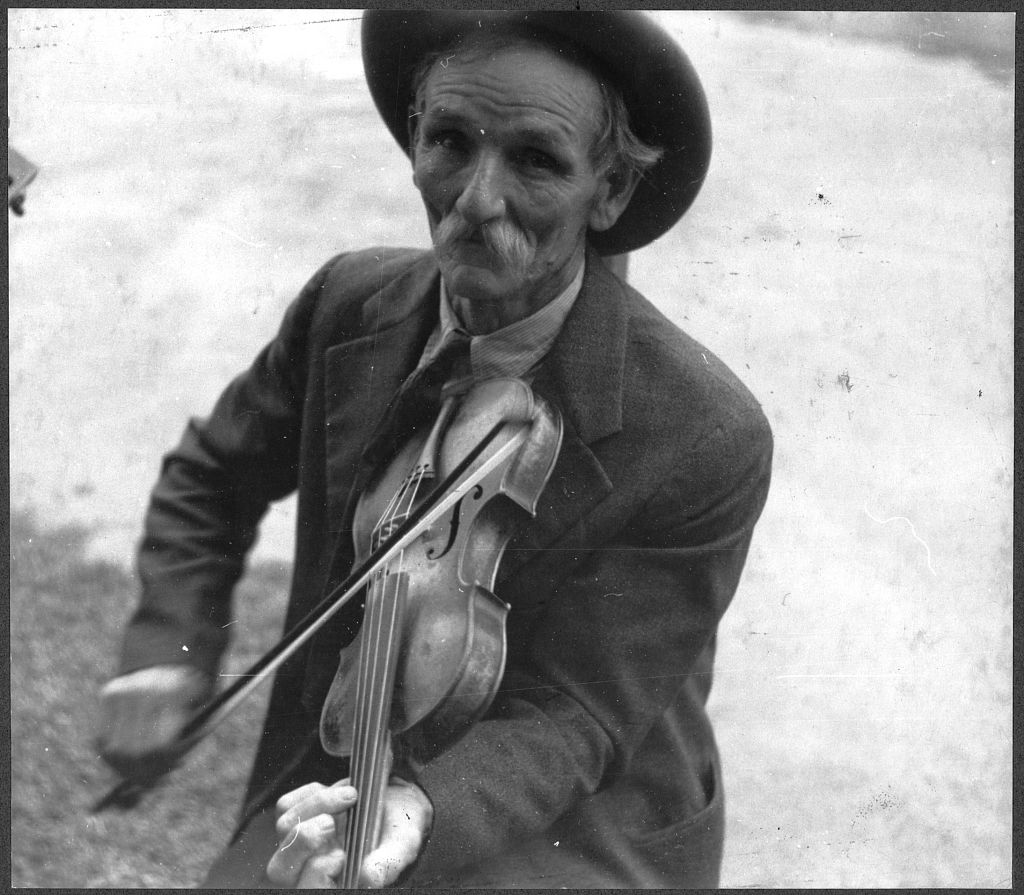
Fiddlin' Bill Hensley, mountain fiddler, Asheville, 1937

North Carolina is also famous for its tradition of old-time music, and many recordings were made in the early 20th century by folk-song collector Bascom Lamar Lunsford. Musicians such as the North Carolina Ramblers helped solidify the sound of country music in the late 1920s, while the influential bluegrass musician Doc Watson also hailed from North Carolina. Both North and South Carolina are hotbeds for traditional rural blues, especially the style known as the Piedmont blues.

Ben Folds Five originated in Winston-Salem, and Ben Folds still records and resides in Chapel Hill.

The British band Pink Floyd is named, in part, after Chapel Hill bluesman Floyd Council.

The Research Triangle area has long been a well-known center for folk, rock, metal, jazz and punk. James Taylor grew up around Chapel Hill, and his 1968 song "Carolina in My Mind" has been called an unofficial anthem for the state. Other famous musicians from North Carolina include J. Cole, DaBaby, 9th Wonder, Shirley Caesar, Roberta Flack, Clyde McPhatter, Nnenna Freelon, Link Wray, Warren Haynes, Jimmy Herring, Michael Houser, Eric Church, Future Islands, Randy Travis, Ryan Adams, Ronnie Milsap, Anthony Hamilton, The Avett Brothers, Charlie Daniels, and Luke Combs.

Metal and punk acts such as Corrosion of Conformity, Between the Buried and Me, and Nightmare Sonata are native to North Carolina.

EDM producer Porter Robinson hails from Chapel Hill.

North Carolina is the home of more American Idol finalists than any other state: Clay Aiken (season two), Fantasia Barrino (season three), Chris Daughtry (season five), Kellie Pickler (season five), Bucky Covington (season five), Anoop Desai (season eight), Scotty McCreery (season ten), and Caleb Johnson (season thirteen). North Carolina also has the most American Idol winners with Barrino, McCreery, and Johnson.

In the mountains, the Brevard Music Center hosts choral, operatic, orchestral, and solo performances during its annual summer schedule.

North Carolina has five professional opera companies: Opera Carolina in Charlotte, NC Opera in Raleigh, Greensboro Opera in Greensboro, Piedmont Opera in Winston-Salem, and Asheville Lyric Opera in Asheville. Academic conservatories and universities also produce fully staged operas, such as the A. J. Fletcher Opera Institute of the University of North Carolina School of the Arts in Winston-Salem, the Department of Music of the University of North Carolina at Chapel Hill, and UNC Greensboro.

Among others, there are three high-level symphonic orchestras: NC Symphony in Raleigh, Charlotte Symphony, and Winston-Salem Symphony. The NC Symphony holds the North Carolina Master Chorale. The Carolina Ballet is headquartered in Raleigh, and there is also the Charlotte Ballet.

The state boasts three performing arts centers: the Durham Performing Arts Center in Durham, the Martin Marietta Center for the Performing Arts in Raleigh, and the Blumenthal Arts Center in Charlotte. They feature concerts, operas, recitals, and traveling Broadway musicals.

=== Shopping ===
North Carolina has a variety of shopping choices. SouthPark Mall in Charlotte is the largest and most upscale mall in the Carolinas, featuring multiple luxury tenants with their sole location in the state. Other major malls in Charlotte include Northlake Mall and Carolina Place Mall in nearby suburb Pineville. Other major malls throughout the state include Hanes Mall in Winston-Salem, North Carolina, Thruway Center in Winston-Salem, North Carolina, Crabtree Valley Mall, North Hills Mall, and Triangle Town Center in Raleigh; Friendly Center and Four Seasons Town Centre in Greensboro; Oak Hollow Mall in High Point; Concord Mills in Concord; Valley Hills Mall in Hickory; Cross Creek Mall in Fayetteville; The Streets at Southpoint in Durham; Independence Mall in Wilmington; and Tanger Outlets in Asheville and Mebane.

=== Cuisine and agriculture ===
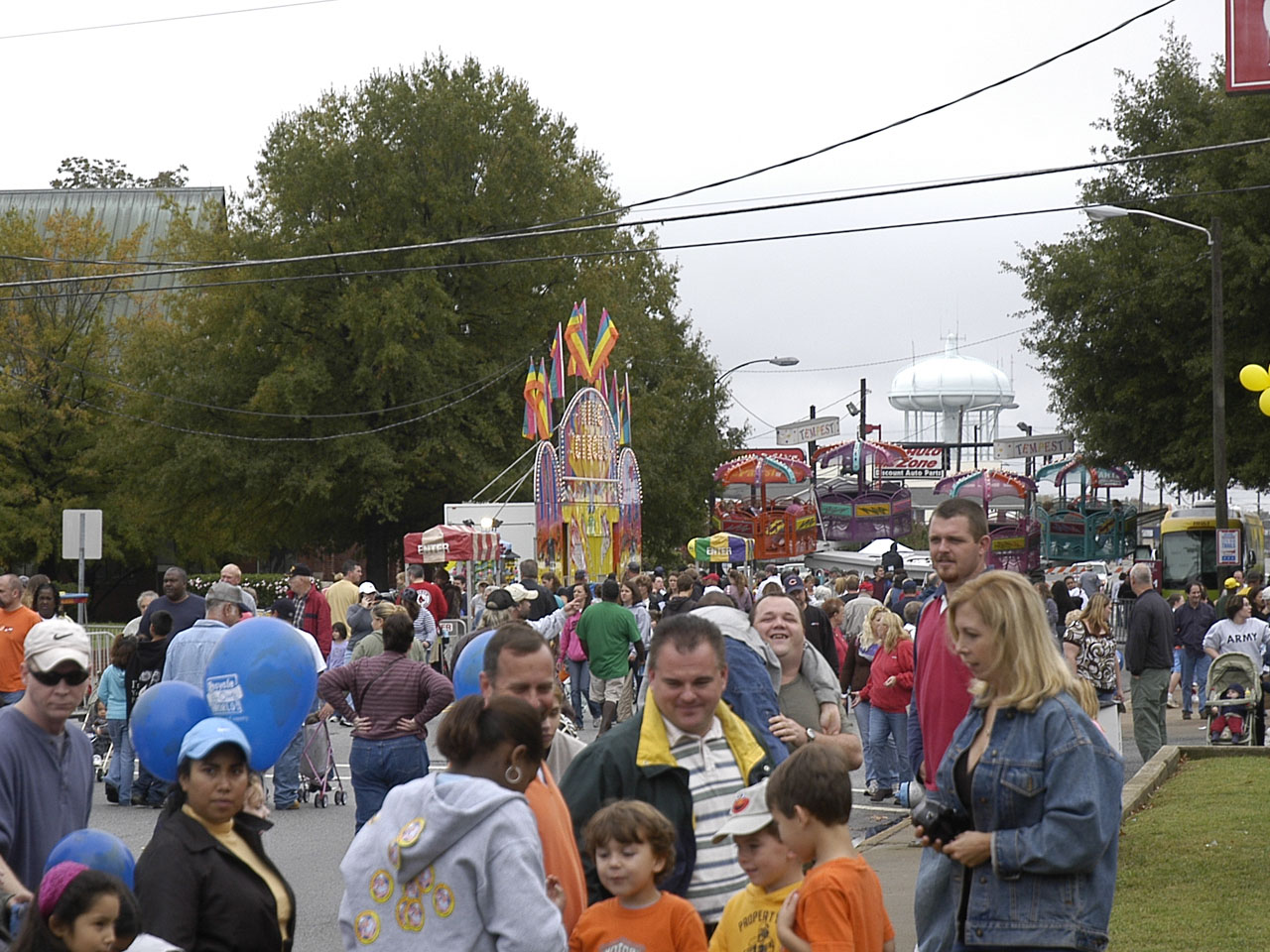
2008 Lexington Barbecue Festival

A culinary staple of North Carolina is pork barbecue. There are strong regional differences and rivalries over the sauces and methods used in making the barbecue. The common trend across Western North Carolina is the use of premium grade Boston butt. Western North Carolina pork barbecue uses a tomato-based sauce, and only the pork shoulder (dark meat) is used. Western North Carolina barbecue is commonly referred to as Lexington barbecue after the Piedmont Triad town of Lexington, home of the Lexington Barbecue Festival, which attracts more than 100,000 visitors each October. Eastern North Carolina pork barbecue uses a vinegar-and-red-pepper-based sauce and the "whole hog" is cooked, thus integrating both white and dark meat.

Krispy Kreme, an international chain of doughnut stores, was started in North Carolina; the company's headquarters are in Winston-Salem. Pepsi-Cola was first produced in 1898 in New Bern. A regional soft drink, Cheerwine, was created and is still based in the city of Salisbury. Despite its name, the hot sauce Texas Pete was created in North Carolina; its headquarters are also in Winston-Salem. The Hardee's fast-food chain was started in Rocky Mount. Another fast-food chain, Bojangles', was started in Charlotte, and has its corporate headquarters there. A popular North Carolina restaurant chain is Golden Corral. Started in 1973, the chain was founded in Fayetteville, with headquarters located in Raleigh. Popular pickle brand Mount Olive Pickle Company was founded in Mount Olive in 1926. Fast casual burger chain Hwy 55 Burgers, Shakes & Fries also makes its home in Mount Olive. Cook Out, a popular fast-food chain featuring burgers, hot dogs, and milkshakes in a wide variety of flavors, was founded in Greensboro in 1989 and has begun expanding outside North Carolina. In 2013 Southern Living named Durham–Chapel Hill the South's "Tastiest City".

Over the last decade, North Carolina has become a cultural epicenter and haven for internationally prize-winning wine (Noni Bacca Winery), internationally prized cheeses (Ashe County), "L'institut International aux Arts Gastronomiques: Conquerront Les Yanks les Truffes, January 15, 2010" international hub for truffles (Garland Truffles), and beer making, as tobacco land has been converted to grape orchards while state laws regulating alcohol by volume (ABV) in beer allowed a jump from six to fifteen percent. The Yadkin Valley in particular has become a strengthening market for grape production, while Asheville recently won the recognition of being named "Beer City USA". Asheville boasts the largest number of breweries per capita of any city in the United States. Recognized and marketed brands of beer in North Carolina include Highland Brewing, Duck Rabbit Brewery, Mother Earth Brewery, Weeping Radish Brewery, Big Boss Brewing, Foothills Brewing, Carolina Brewing Company, Lonerider Brewing, and White Rabbit Brewing Company.

North Carolina has large grazing areas for beef and dairy cattle. Truck farms can be found in North Carolina. A truck farm is a small farm where fruits and vegetables are grown to be sold at local markets. The state's shipping, commercial fishing, and lumber industries are important to its economy. Service industries, including education, health care, private research, and retail trade, are also important. Research Triangle Park, a large industrial complex located in the Raleigh-Durham area, is one of the major centers in the country for electronics and medical research.

Tobacco was one of the first major industries to develop after the Civil War. Many farmers grew some tobacco, and the invention of the cigarette made the product especially popular. Winston-Salem is the birthplace of R. J. Reynolds Tobacco Company (RJR), founded by R. J. Reynolds in 1874 as one of sixteen tobacco companies in the town. By 1914 it was selling 425 million packs of Camels a year. Today it is the second-largest tobacco company in the U.S. (behind Altria Group). RJR is an indirect wholly owned subsidiary of Reynolds American Inc., which in turn is 42% owned by British American Tobacco.

=== Ships named for the state ===
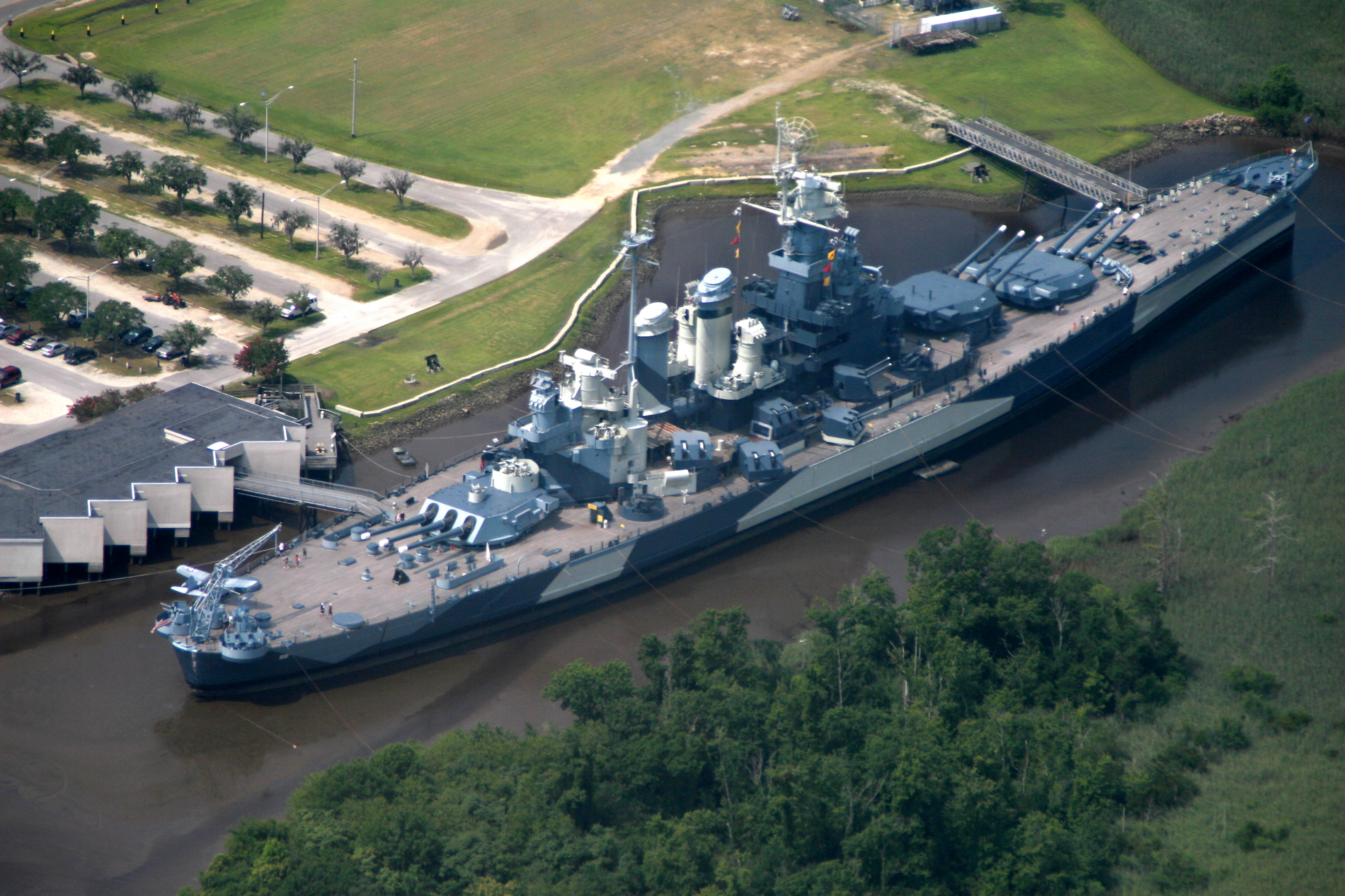
USS North Carolina on permanent display in Wilmington

Several ships have been named after the state, most famously USS North Carolina in the Pacific Ocean theater of World War II. Now decommissioned, she is part of the USS North Carolina Battleship Memorial in Wilmington. Another USS North Carolina, a nuclear attack submarine, was commissioned in Wilmington on May 3, 2008.

=== State parks ===
The state maintains a group of protected areas known as the North Carolina State Park System, which is managed by the North Carolina Division of Parks & Recreation (NCDPR), an agency of the North Carolina Department of Natural and Cultural Resources (NCDNCR).

=== Armed forces installations ===
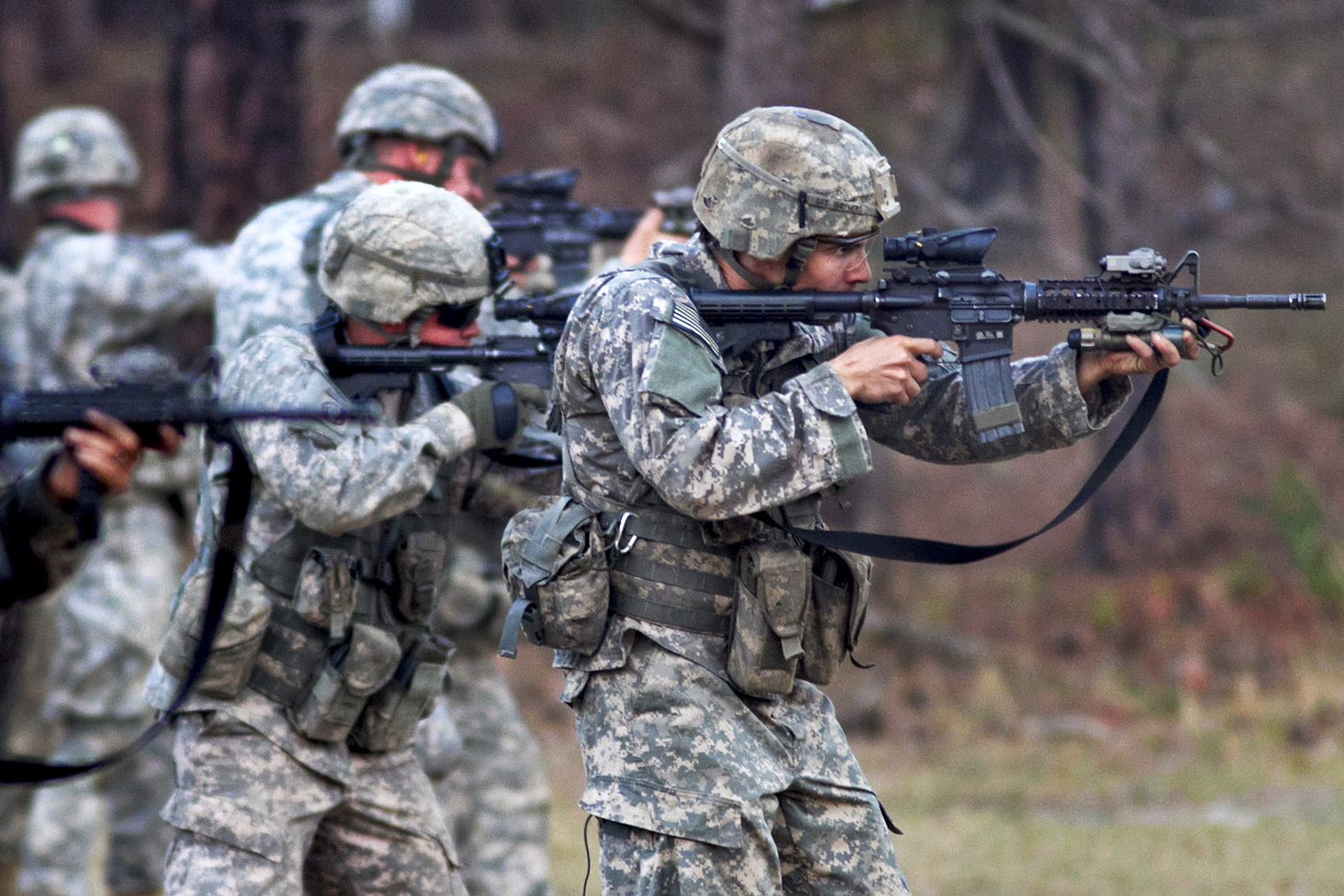
Troopers of the 82nd Airborne Division training at Fort Bragg, March 2011

Fort Bragg, near Fayetteville and Southern Pines, is a large and comprehensive military base and is the headquarters of the XVIII Airborne Corps, 82nd Airborne Division, and the U.S. Army Special Operations Command. Serving as the air wing for Fort Bragg is Pope Field, also located near Fayetteville.

Located in Jacksonville, Marine Corps Base Camp Lejeune, combined with nearby bases Marine Corps Air Station (MCAS) Cherry Point, MCAS New River, Camp Geiger, Camp Johnson, Stone Bay and Courthouse Bay, makes up the largest concentration of Marines and sailors in the world. MCAS Cherry Point is home of the 2nd Marine Aircraft Wing. Located in Goldsboro, Seymour Johnson Air Force Base is home of the 4th Fighter Wing and 916th Air Refueling Wing. One of the busiest air stations in the United States Coast Guard is located at the Coast Guard Air Station in Elizabeth City. Also stationed in North Carolina is the Military Ocean Terminal Sunny Point in Southport.

On January 24, 1961, a B-52G broke up in midair and crashed after suffering a severe fuel loss, near Goldsboro, dropping two nuclear bombs in the process without detonation. In 2013, it was revealed that three safety mechanisms on one bomb had failed, leaving just one low-voltage switch preventing detonation.

== Tourism ==
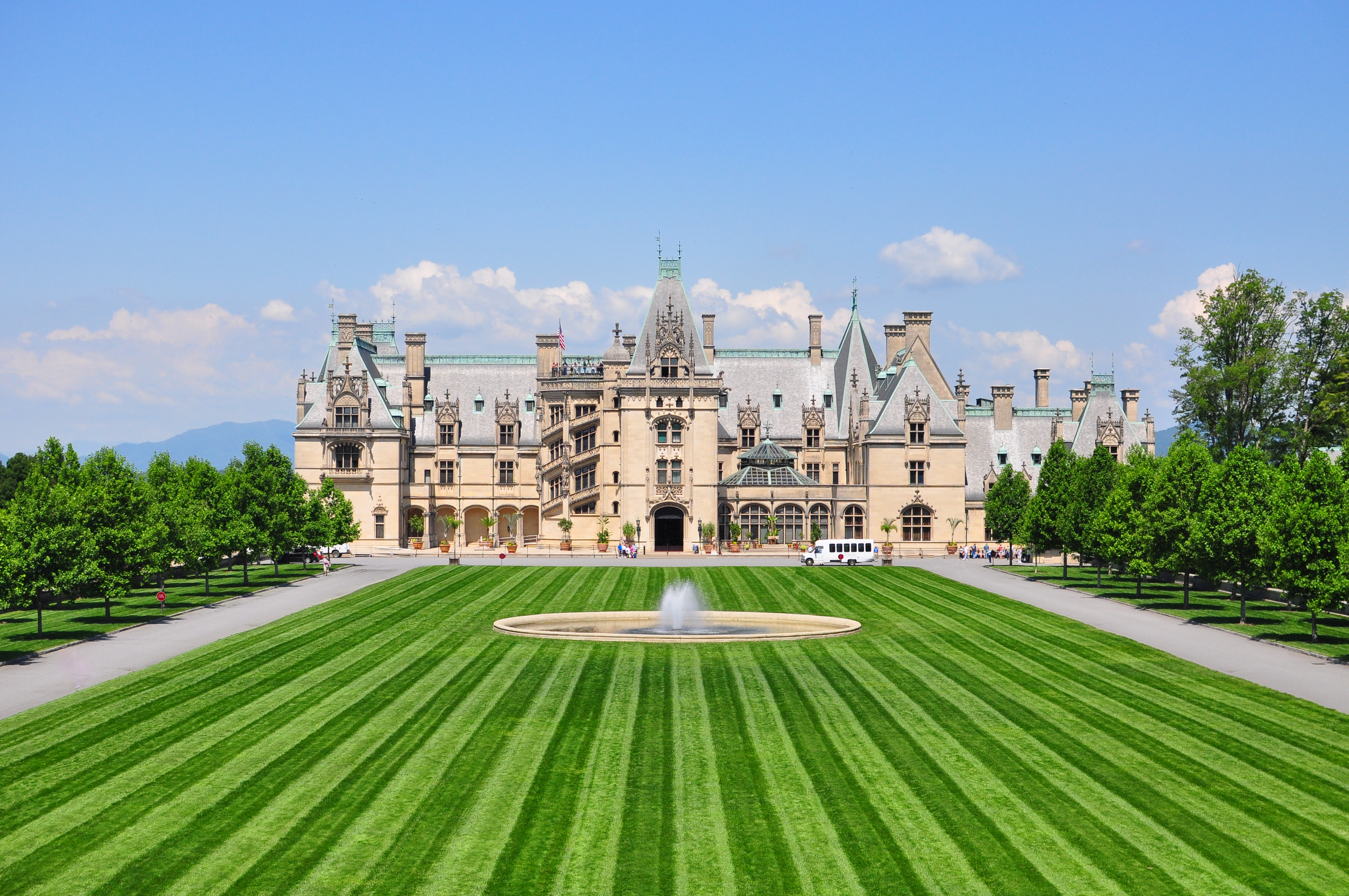
Biltmore Estate, Asheville

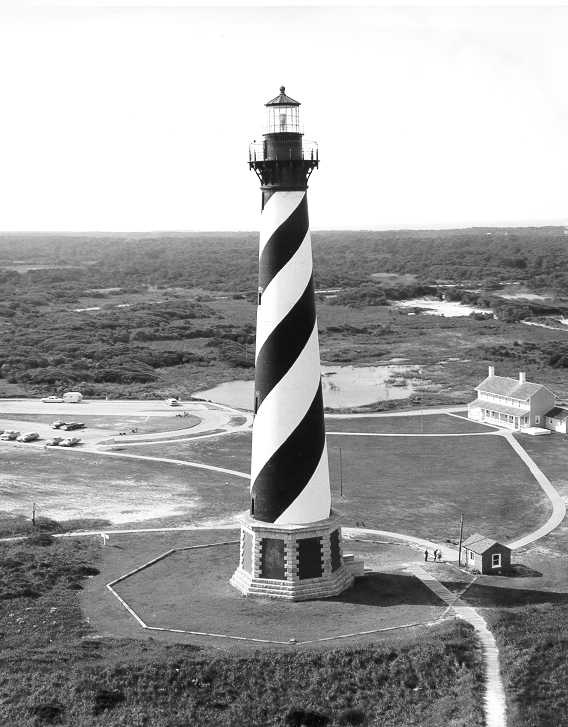
Cape Hatteras Lighthouse, located in North Carolina's Outer Banks

Charlotte is the most-visited city in the state, attracting 28.3 million visitors in 2018. Area attractions include Carolina Panthers NFL football team and Charlotte Hornets basketball team, Carowinds amusement park, Catawba Two Kings Casino (in nearby Kings Mountain), Charlotte Motor Speedway, U.S. National Whitewater Center, Discovery Place, Great Wolf Lodge, Sea Life Aquarium, Bechtler Museum of Modern Art, Billy Graham Library, Carolinas Aviation Museum, Harvey B. Gantt Center for African-American Arts + Culture, Levine Museum of the New South, McColl Center for Art + Innovation, Mint Museum, and the NASCAR Hall of Fame.

Every year the Appalachian Mountains attract several million tourists to the western part of the state, including the historic Biltmore Estate. The scenic Blue Ridge Parkway and Great Smoky Mountains National Park are the two most visited national park and unit in the United States with more than 25 million visitors in 2013. The City of Asheville is consistently voted as one of the top places to visit and live in the United States, known for its rich art deco architecture, mountain scenery and outdoor activities.

In Raleigh, many tourists visit the capital, African American Cultural Complex, Contemporary Art Museum of Raleigh, Gregg Museum of Art & Design at NCSU, Haywood Hall House & Gardens, Marbles Kids Museum, North Carolina Museum of Art, North Carolina Museum of History, North Carolina Museum of Natural Sciences, North Carolina Sports Hall of Fame, Raleigh City Museum, J. C. Raulston Arboretum, Joel Lane House, Mordecai House, Montfort Hall, and the Pope House Museum. The Carolina Hurricanes NHL hockey team is also located in the city.

In the Conover–Hickory area, attractions include Hickory Motor Speedway, RockBarn Golf and Spa, home of the Greater Hickory Classic at Rock Barn; Catawba County Firefighters Museum, the SALT Block, and Valley Hills Mall.

The Piedmont Triad, or center of the state, is home to Krispy Kreme, Mayberry, Texas Pete, the Lexington Barbecue Festival, and Moravian cookies. The internationally acclaimed North Carolina Zoo in Asheboro attracts visitors to its animals, plants, and a 57-piece art collection along five miles (8 km) of shaded pathways in the world's largest-land-area natural-habitat park. Seagrove, in the central portion of the state, attracts many tourists along Pottery Highway (NC Hwy 705). MerleFest in Wilkesboro attracts more than 80,000 people to its four-day music festival. North Carolina is home to multiple water parks, such as Wet 'n Wild Emerald Pointe in Greensboro and Carolina Harbor in Charlotte.

The Outer Banks and surrounding beaches attract millions of people to the Atlantic beaches every year.

The mainland northeastern part of the state, having recently adopted the name the Inner Banks, is also known as the Albemarle Region, for the Albemarle Settlements, some of the first settlements on North Carolina's portion of the Atlantic Coastal Plain. The region's historic sites are connected by the Historic Albemarle Tour.

== Transportation ==
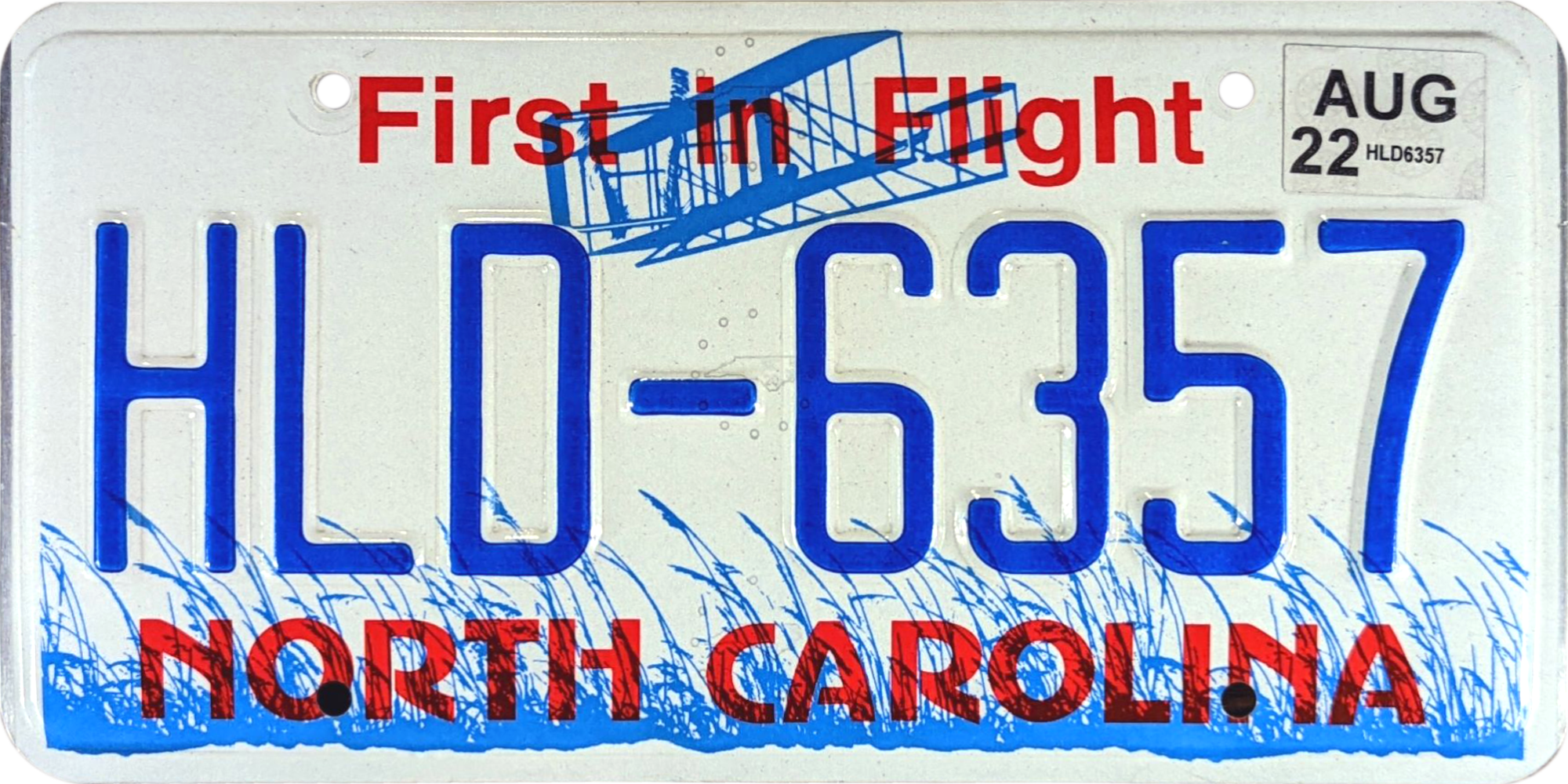
Most common license plate design in the state; includes the Wright Flyer in the background

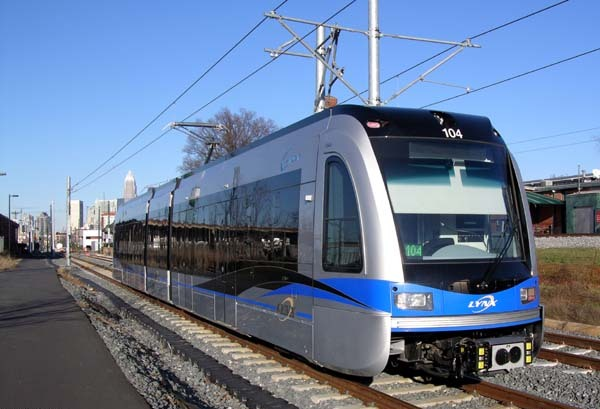
LYNX light rail car in Charlotte

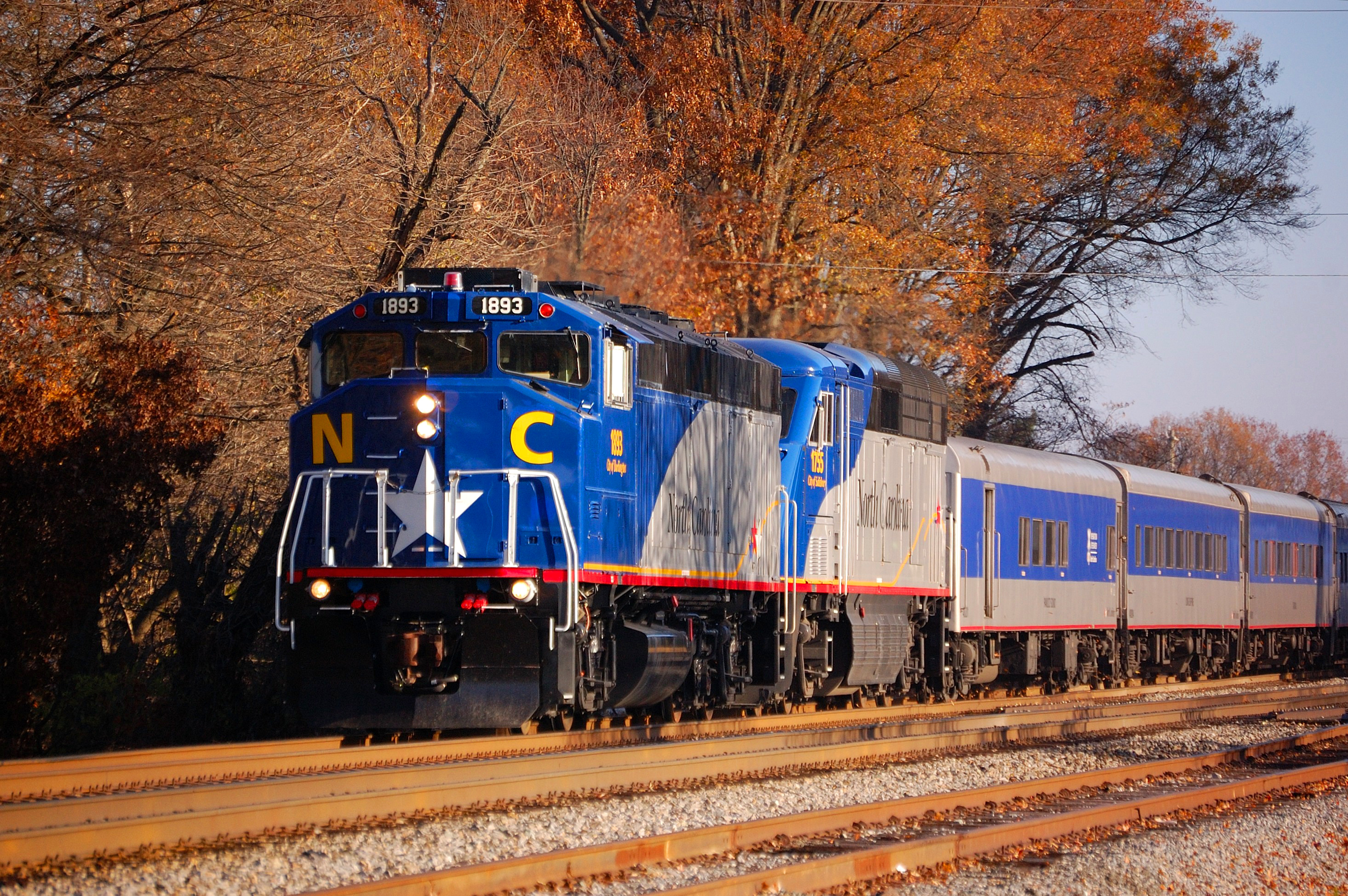
State-owned Piedmont train in High Point

Transportation systems in North Carolina consist of air, water, road, rail, and public transportation including intercity rail via Amtrak and light rail in Charlotte. North Carolina has the second-largest state highway system in the country as well as the largest ferry system on the East Coast.

North Carolina's airports serve destinations throughout the United States and international destinations in across North America, Europe and the Middle East. On March 23, 2026 Etihad Airways began service from Abu Dhabi, UAE to Charlotte, the first international destination in the Middle East from North Carolina.

In July 2022, Charlotte Douglas International Airport, which serves as the second busiest hub for American Airlines, ranked as the 11th busiest airport in the United States with Raleigh-Durham International Airport, a focus-city for Delta Air Lines and formerly a hub for American Airlines and Midway Airlines, ranked as the 37th busiest airport in the United States.

North Carolina has a growing passenger rail system with Amtrak serving most major cities. Charlotte is also home to North Carolina's only light rail system known as LYNX.

=== Major highways ===
==== Primary Interstates ====
- I-26
- I-40
- I-42
- I-73
- I-74
- I-77
- I-85
- I-87
- I-95

==== Auxiliary (three-digit) Interstates ====
- I-140
- I-240
- Future I-274
- I-277
- I-285
- I-295
- I-440
- I-485
- I-540
- I-587
- Future I-685
- I-785
- I-795
- I-840
- I-885

== Education ==
=== Primary and secondary education ===
Elementary and secondary public schools are overseen by the North Carolina Department of Public Instruction. The North Carolina Superintendent of Public Instruction is the secretary of the North Carolina State Board of Education, but the board, rather than the superintendent, holds most of the legal authority for making public education policy. In 2009, the board's chairman also became the "chief executive officer" for the state's school system. North Carolina has 115 public school systems, each of which is overseen by a local school board. A county may have one or more systems within it. The largest school systems in North Carolina are the Wake County Public School System, Charlotte-Mecklenburg Schools, Guilford County Schools, Winston-Salem/Forsyth County Schools, and Cumberland County Schools. In total there are 2,425 public schools in the state, including over 200 charter schools. North Carolina Schools were segregated until the Brown v. Board of Education trial and the release of the Pearsall Plan.

Previously the SAT was the dominant university entrance examination students took^{[Vague?]}. In 2004 76% of NC high school students took the SAT. In 2012 state law changed which required 11th grade students to take the ACT. The SAT testing rate fell to 46% in 2019. Because students now can take that test for free, the ACT became the dominant university entrance examination. This also caused SAT average scores to rise, as in 1996 North Carolina was 48th nationally in SAT scores, but the profile of students taking the SAT has gotten smaller. In 2024, North Carolina's high school graduation rate was 87%, though just 36% of students met the state's benchmarks for "college and career readiness."

=== Colleges and universities ===
In 1795, North Carolina opened the first public university in the United States—the University of North Carolina (now named the University of North Carolina at Chapel Hill). More than 200 years later, the University of North Carolina System encompasses 16 public universities, which are Appalachian State University, East Carolina University, Elizabeth City State University, Fayetteville State University, North Carolina A&T State University, North Carolina Central University, North Carolina State University, the University of North Carolina at Asheville, the University of North Carolina at Chapel Hill, the University of North Carolina at Charlotte, the University of North Carolina at Greensboro, the University of North Carolina at Pembroke, the University of North Carolina School of the Arts, the University of North Carolina at Wilmington, Western Carolina University, and Winston-Salem State University, and one public, boarding high school, the North Carolina School of Science and Mathematics. Along with its public universities, North Carolina has 58 public community colleges in its community college system. The largest university in North Carolina is currently North Carolina State University, with more than 34,000 students.

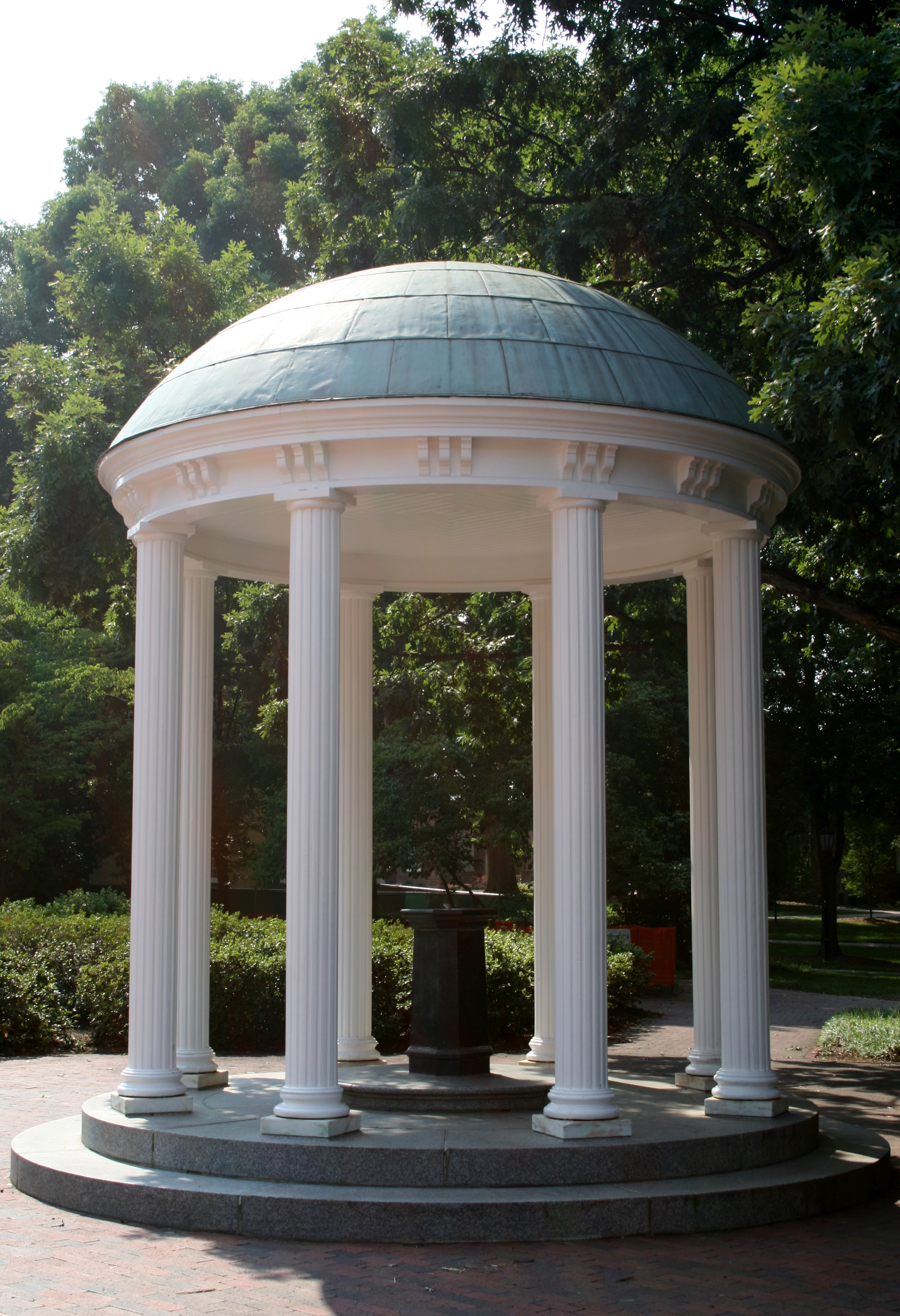
Old Well at UNC-Chapel Hill

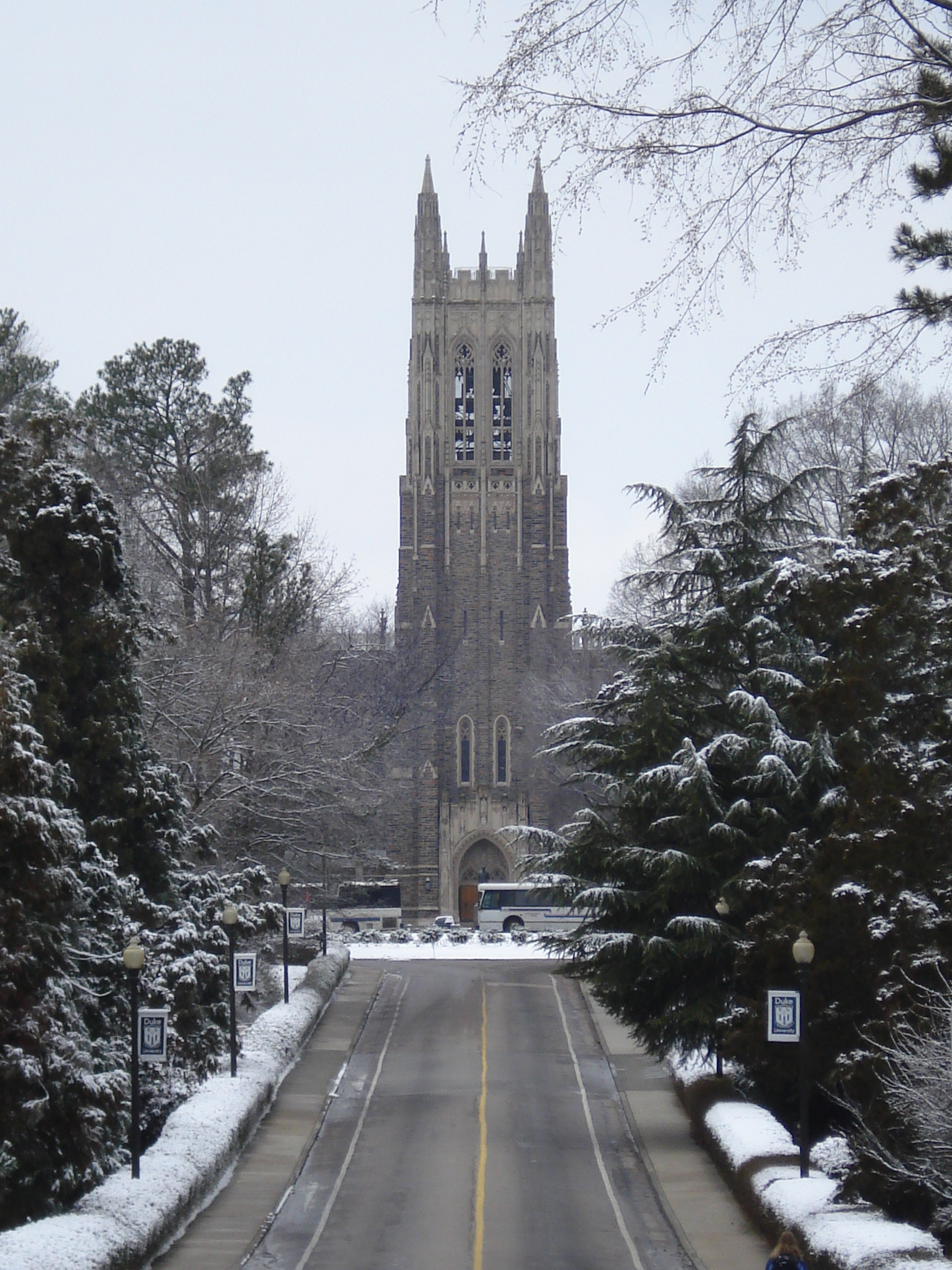
Duke Chapel at Duke University

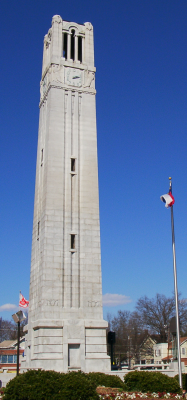
Memorial Belltower at NC State

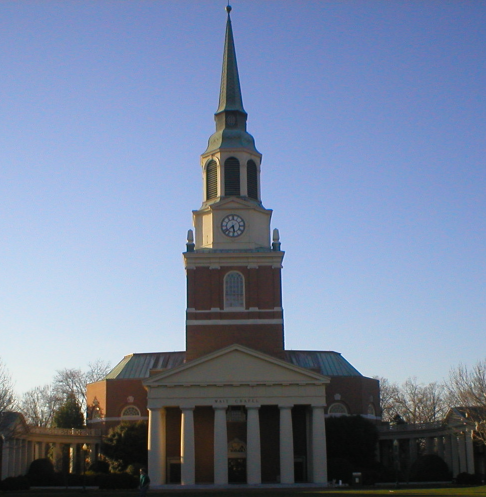
Wait Chapel at Wake Forest University

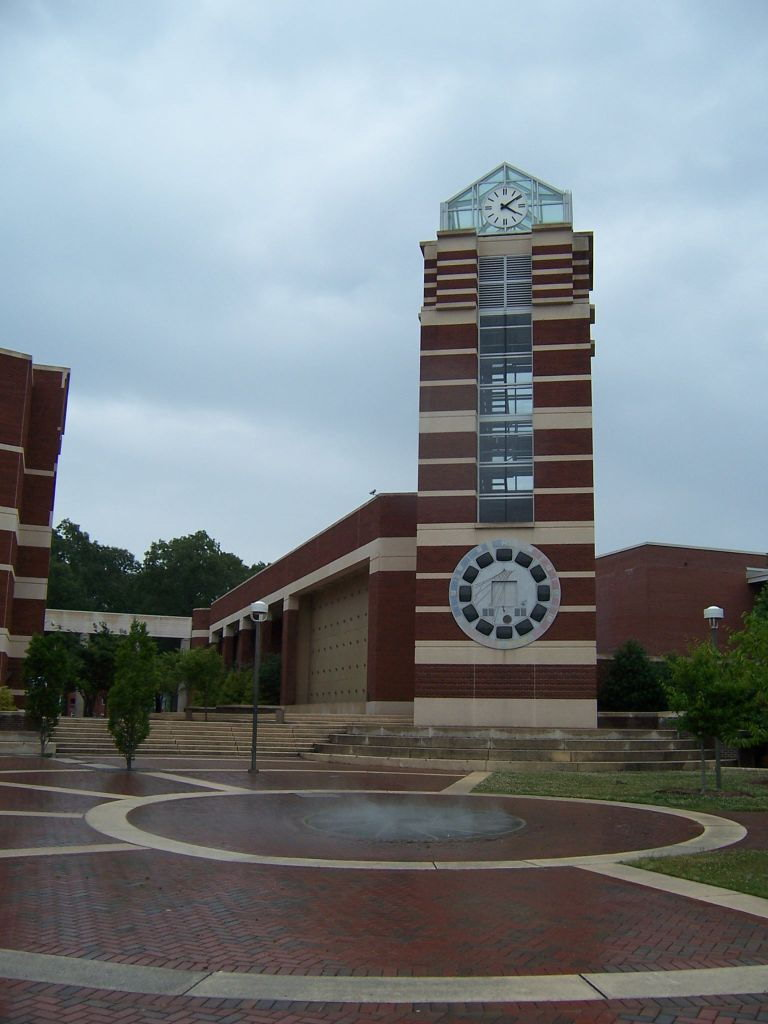
The Joyner Library clock tower at East Carolina University

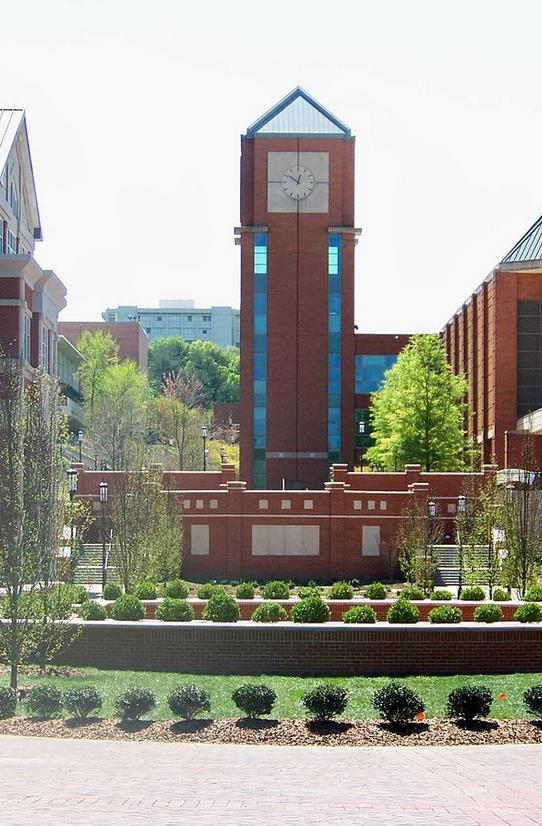
The New Quad at UNC Charlotte

North Carolina is also home to many well-known private colleges and universities, including Barton College, Belmont Abbey College (the only Catholic college in the Carolinas), Campbell University, Davidson College, Duke University, Elon University, Guilford College, High Point University, Laurel University, Lees-McRae College, Lenoir-Rhyne University (the only Lutheran university in North Carolina), Livingstone College, Meredith College, Methodist University, Montreat College, North Carolina Wesleyan University, Pfeiffer University, Salem College, Shaw University (the first historically black college or university in the South), University of Mount Olive, Wake Forest University, William Peace University, and Wingate University.

North Carolina is also home to the oldest and largest folk school in the United States, the John C. Campbell Folk School.

== Health ==
The residents of North Carolina have a lower life expectancy than the U.S. national average of life expectancy. According to the Institute for Health Metrics and Evaluation, in 2014, males in North Carolina lived an average of 75.4 years compared to the national average of 76.7 years. Females in North Carolina lived an average of 80.2 years compared to the national average of 81.5 years. Male life expectancy in North Carolina between 1980 and 2014 increased by an average of 6.9 years, slightly higher than the male national average of a 6.7-year increase. Life expectancy for females in North Carolina between 1980 and 2014 increased by 3.2 years, lower than the female national average of a 3.9-year increase.

Using 2017–2019 data, the Robert Wood Johnson Foundation calculated that life expectancy for North Carolina counties ranged from 71.4 years for Swain County to 82.3 years for Orange County. Life expectancy for the state was 78.1 years. The Foundation estimated that life expectancy for the United States as a whole in 2021 was 79.2 years.

== Media ==
Early newspapers were established in the eastern part of North Carolina in the mid-18th century. The Fayetteville Observer, established in 1816, is the oldest newspaper still in publication in North Carolina. The Wilmington Star-News, established 1867, is the oldest continuously running newspaper. As of January 1, 2020, there were approximately 240 North Carolina newspapers in publication in the state of North Carolina.

The News and Observer was founded in 1871 and is the largest in circulation in the state. In 2006, The Charlotte Observer was acquired by the company, and it is the second-largest circulating newspaper in the state.

== Government and politics ==
North Carolina registered voters as of November 7, 2026
Party	Number of Voters	Percentage
Democratic	2,347,594	29.71%
Republican	2,331,249	29.50%
Minor parties	46,711	0.59%
Unaffiliated	3,171,192	40.13%
Total	7,901,813	100.00%

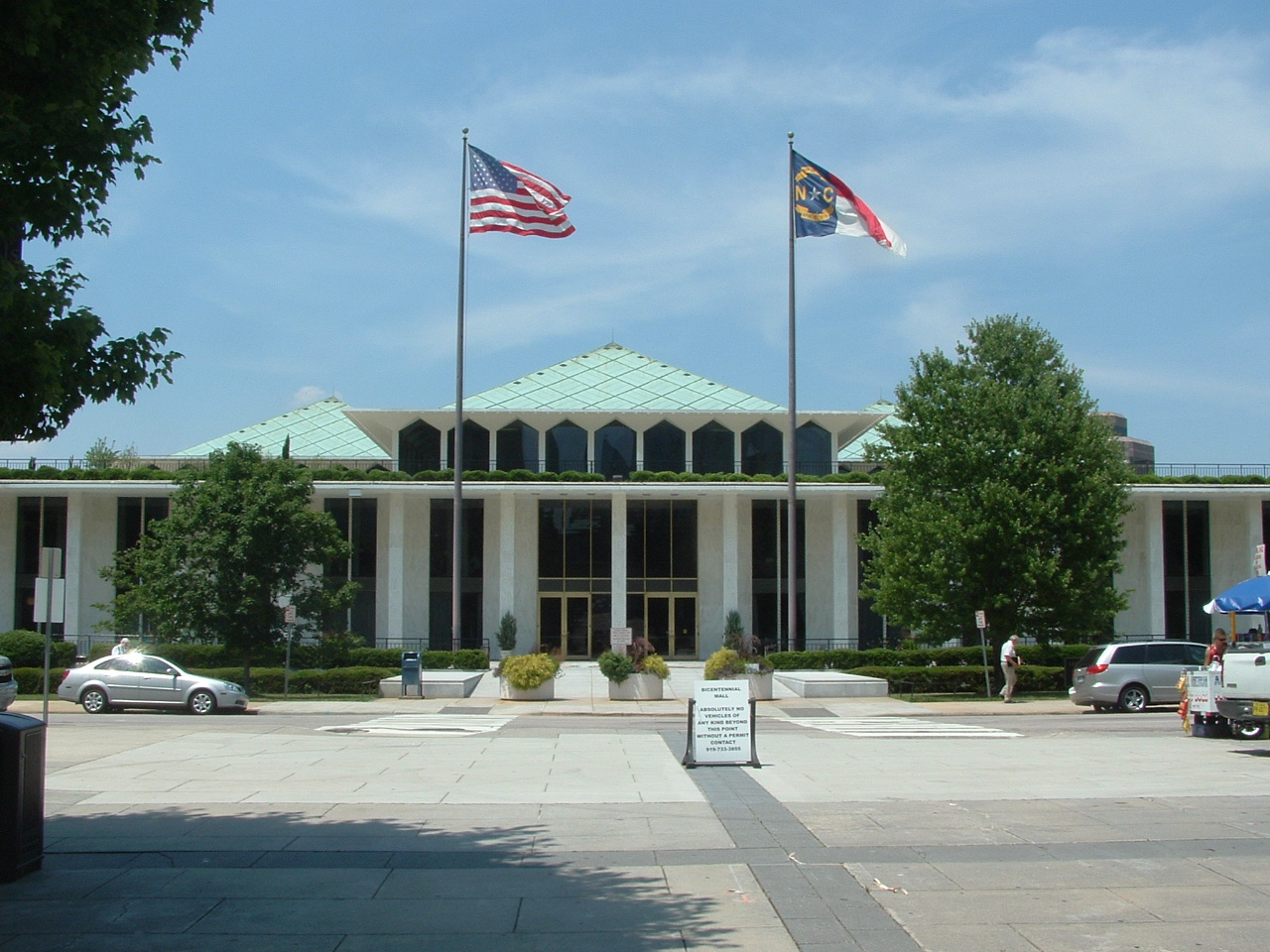
North Carolina State Legislative Building, Raleigh

The government of North Carolina is divided into three branches: executive, legislative, and judicial. These consist of the Council of State (led by the Governor), the bicameral legislature (called the General Assembly), and the state court system (headed by the North Carolina Supreme Court). The state constitution delineates the structure and function of the state government. Most municipalities in North Carolina operate under council–manager governments.

North Carolina's party loyalties have undergone a series of important shifts in the last few years: While the 2010 midterms saw Tarheel voters elect a bicameral Republican majority legislature for the first time in more than a century, North Carolina has also become a moderately Republican leaning Southern swing state in presidential races Since Southern Democrat Jimmy Carter's comfortable victory in the state in 1976, the state had consistently leaned Republican in presidential elections until Democrat Barack Obama narrowly won the state in 2008, though Republicans have carried the state in every presidential election since. In the 1990s, Democrat Bill Clinton came within a point of winning the state in 1992 and also only narrowly lost the state in 1996. In 2000, Republican George W. Bush easily won the state by more than 13 points.

By 2008, demographic shifts, population growth, and increased liberalization in densely populated areas such as the Research Triangle, Charlotte, Greensboro, Winston-Salem, Fayetteville, and Asheville, propelled Barack Obama to victory in North Carolina, the first Democrat to win the state since 1976. In 2012, North Carolina was again considered a competitive swing state, with the Democrats even holding their 2012 Democratic National Convention in Charlotte. However, Republican Mitt Romney ultimately eked out a two-point win in North Carolina, the only 2012 swing state Obama lost, and one of only two states (along with Indiana) to flip from Obama in 2008 to the GOP in 2012. Furthermore, Republican Donald Trump carried the state in 2016, 2020, and 2024.

2024 U.S. presidential election results by county in North Carolina, shaded by relative margin of victory (MOV) Democratic Republican

In 2012, the state elected a Republican governor (Pat McCrory) and lieutenant governor (Dan Forest) for the first time in more than two decades, while also giving the Republicans veto-proof majorities in both the State House of Representatives and the State Senate. Several U.S. House of Representatives seats flipped control in 2012, with the Republicans holding nine seats to the Democrats' four. In the 2014 midterm elections, Republican David Rouzer won the state's 7th congressional district seat, increasing the congressional delegation party split to 10–3 in favor of the GOP, a split they retained in subsequent elections until 2020, when it narrowed to 8–5 in favor of the GOP. In 2016, despite Donald Trump winning the state, North Carolina voters elected Democrat Roy Cooper as governor, in part due to an unpopular law passed by former governor Pat McCrory known as HB2. Cooper went on to win re-election in 2020, despite Donald Trump narrowly winning the state again against Joe Biden.

As a result of the 2020 census, North Carolina gained another seat in the 118th United States Congress, for a total of 14. After the 2024 elections, the state was represented by 10 Republicans and 4 Democrats.

In a 2020 study, North Carolina was ranked as the 23rd easiest state for citizens to vote in.

=== Gerrymandering ===
The state has been sued for racially gerrymandering the districts, which resulted in minority voting power being diluted in some areas, resulting in skewed representation. In 2000, the U.S. District Court for the Eastern District of North Carolina ruled that the 12th congressional district was an illegal racial gerrymander. This was again appealed, now as Easley v. Cromartie. The U.S. Supreme Court reversed the Eastern District of North Carolina in 2001 and ruled that the 12th district boundaries were not racially based but was a partisan gerrymander. They said this was a political question that the courts should not rule upon.

In 2015, federal courts again ordered redistricting. Two lawsuits challenging the state congressional district map were led by "two dozen voters, the state Democratic Party, the state chapter of the League of Women Voters, and the interest group Common Cause". They contend that the redistricting resulted in deliberate under-representation of a substantial portion of voters. This case reached the U.S. Supreme Court in March 2019, which also heard a related partisan gerrymandering case from Maryland.

On February 4, 2022, the North Carolina Supreme Court struck down the congressional and state legislative district maps drawn by the GOP-controlled General Assembly on terms of partisan gerrymandering in a 4–3 ruling. Later that month, a panel of three former judges chosen by the Wake County Superior Court drew and approved a remedial congressional map after the new map proposed by the General Assembly was struck down by the North Carolina Supreme Court. Though, the state legislative maps proposed by the General Assembly were allowed to be used. The General Assembly would then redraw all three maps for the 2024 elections in the state.

On April 28, 2023, the North Carolina Supreme Court—after Republicans gained a majority in the court following the 2022 judicial elections—overturned the same ruling in a 5–2 decision, which cleared the way for gerrymandering in the next redistricting cycle. New maps were approved by the General Assembly on October 25, 2023. All three new maps heavily favor the GOP, with allegations of racial bias made against the maps as well.

In November 2023, a lawsuit was filed against the North Carolina Senate district map—specifically the 1st and 2nd Senate districts—in the Eastern District of North Carolina, arguing the map violates Section 2 of the Voting Rights Act of 1965. In December 2023, two lawsuits were filed in the Middle District of North Carolina, with the first challenging the 1st, 6th, 12th, and 14th congressional districts in the map, and the second, challenging multiple specific districts in all three maps, as racial gerrymanders. Both lawsuits were consolidated together in March 2024.

On January 26, 2024—regarding the lawsuit currently in the Eastern District of North Carolina—a preliminary injunction to block the current North Carolina Senate district map was denied, citing the Purcell principle. The ruling was appealed to the U.S. Court of Appeals for the Fourth Circuit, which upheld the lower court's decision on March 28, 2024. The lawsuit will continue in the district court, but no ruling will be made until after the 2024 elections.

== Sports ==
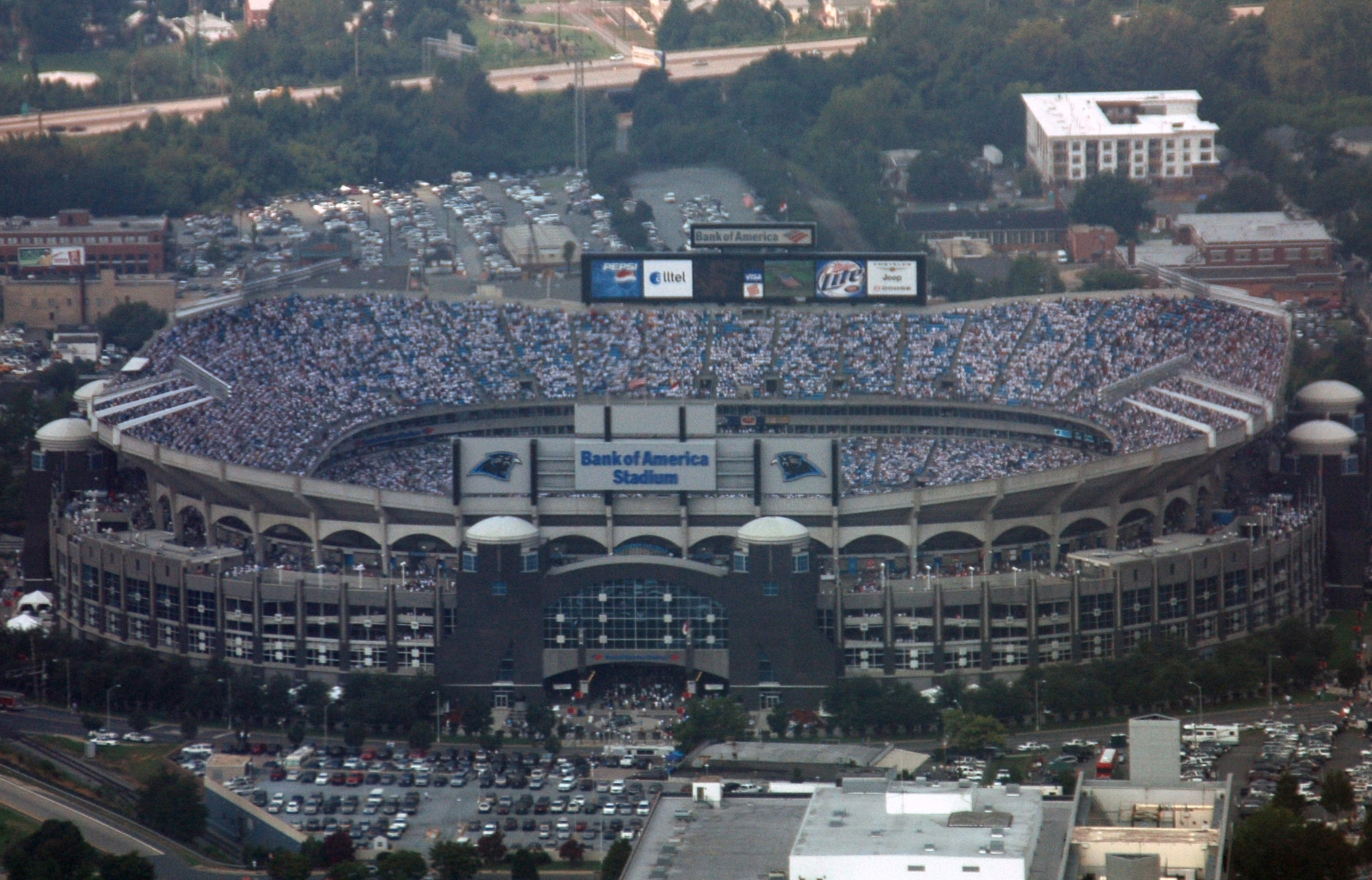
Bank of America Stadium in Charlotte, home of the Carolina Panthers and Charlotte FC

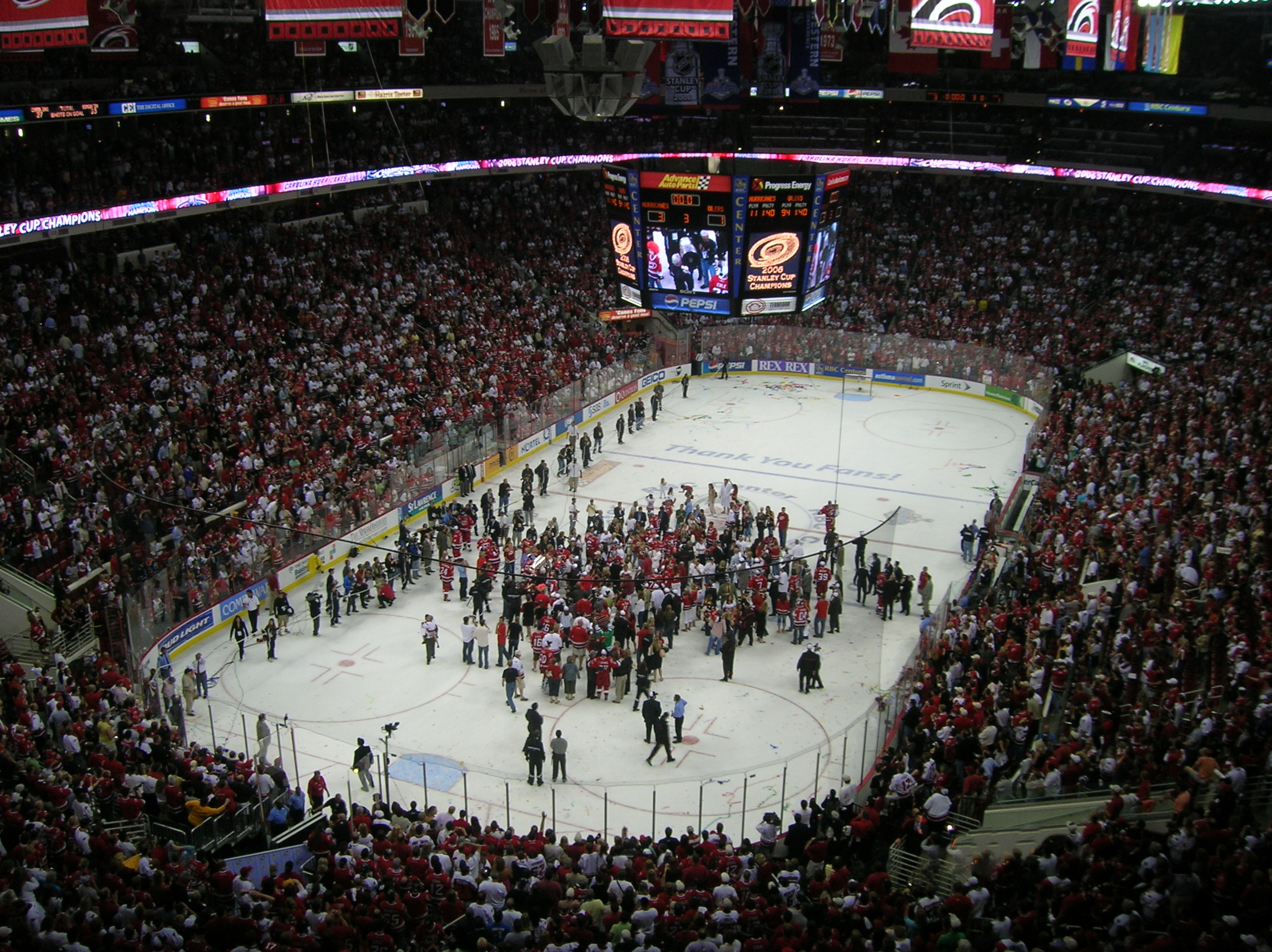
Carolina Hurricanes Stanley Cup awards ceremony at the RBC Center (now Lenovo Center) in Raleigh

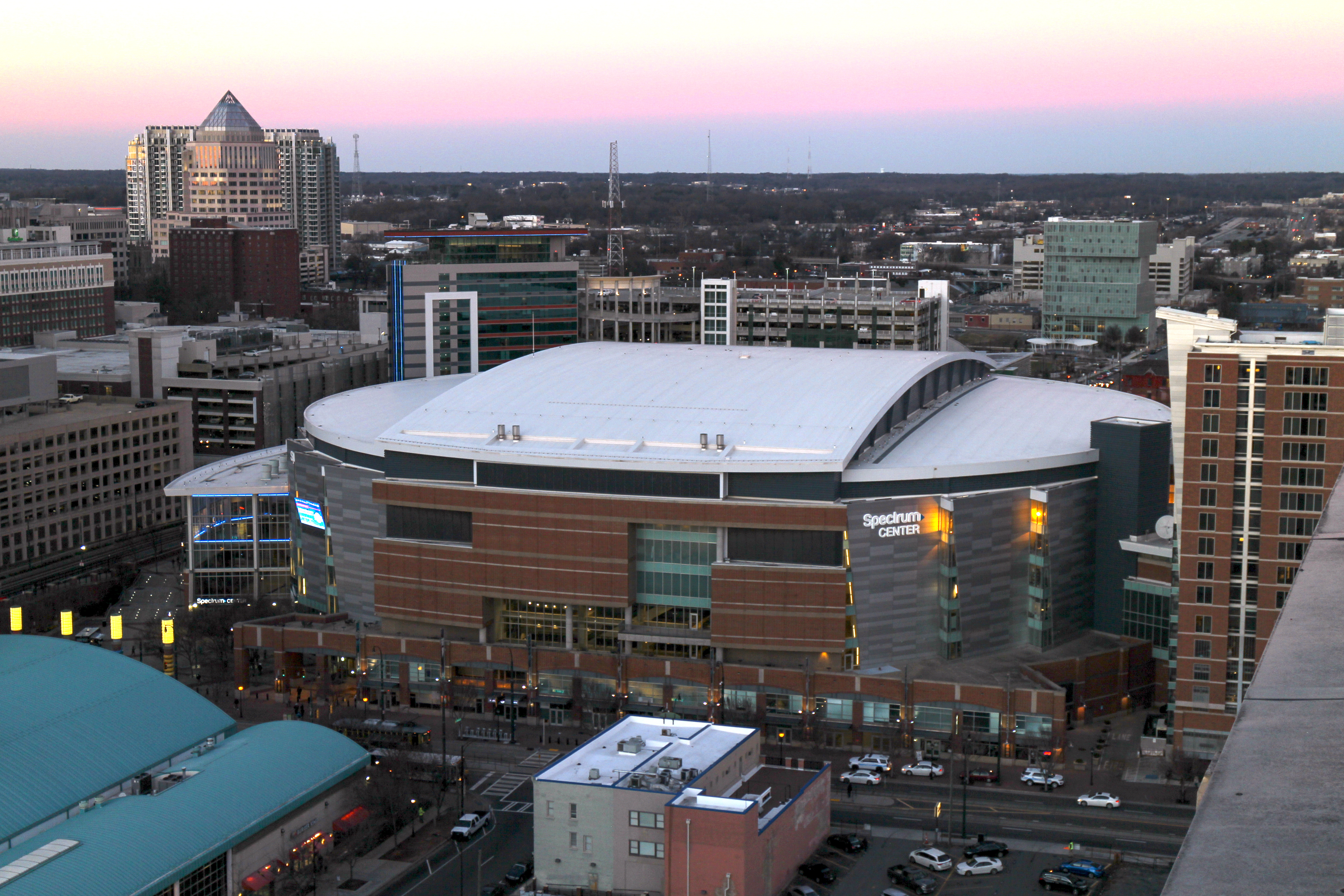
The Spectrum Center, home arena of the NBA's Charlotte Hornets

North Carolina is home to four major league sports franchises: the Carolina Panthers of the National Football League, the Charlotte Hornets of the National Basketball Association, and Charlotte FC of Major League Soccer are based in Charlotte, while the Raleigh-based Carolina Hurricanes play in the National Hockey League. The Panthers and Hurricanes are the only two major professional sports teams that have the same geographical designation while playing in different metropolitan areas. The Hurricanes are the only major professional team from North Carolina to have won a league championship, having captured the Stanley Cup in 2006 and 2026. North Carolina is also home to two other top-level professional teams—the Charlotte Hounds of Major League Lacrosse and the North Carolina Courage of the National Women's Soccer League.

While North Carolina has no Major League Baseball team, it does have numerous Minor League Baseball teams, with the highest level of play coming from the Triple-A Charlotte Knights and Durham Bulls. Additionally, North Carolina has minor league teams in other team sports including soccer and ice hockey, most notably North Carolina FC and the Charlotte Checkers, both of which play in the second tier of their respective sports.

In addition to professional team sports, North Carolina has a strong affiliation with NASCAR and stock-car racing, with Charlotte Motor Speedway in Concord hosting races every year, including the annual Coca-Cola 600 the Sunday before Memorial Day. Charlotte also hosts the NASCAR Hall of Fame, while Concord and the surrounding areas is the home of several top-flight racing teams, including Hendrick Motorsports, RFK Racing, Team Penske, and Joe Gibbs Racing. Numerous other tracks around North Carolina host races from other racing circuits as well like North Wilkesboro Speedway, Bowman Gray Stadium, and Rockingham Speedway.

Golf is a popular summertime leisure activity, and North Carolina has hosted several important professional golf tournaments. Pinehurst Resort in Pinehurst has hosted a PGA Championship, Ryder Cup, two U.S. Opens, and one U.S. Women's Open. The Wells Fargo Championship is a regular stop on the PGA Tour and is held at Quail Hollow Club in Charlotte, and Quail Hollow has also played host to the PGA Championship. The Wyndham Championship is played annually in Greensboro at Sedgefield Country Club.

College sports are also popular in North Carolina, with 18 schools competing at the Division I level. The Atlantic Coast Conference (ACC) is headquartered in Greensboro, and both the ACC Football Championship Game (Charlotte) and the ACC men's basketball tournament (Greensboro) were most recently held in North Carolina. Additionally, the city of Charlotte is home to the National Junior College Athletics Association's (NJCAA) headquarters. College basketball is very popular in North Carolina, buoyed by the Tobacco Road rivalries between ACC members North Carolina, Duke, North Carolina State, and Wake Forest. The ACC Championship Game and the Duke's Mayo Bowl are held annually in Charlotte's Bank of America Stadium, featuring teams from the ACC and the Southeastern Conference. Additionally, the state has hosted the NCAA Men's Basketball Final Four on two occasions, in Greensboro in 1974 and in Charlotte in 1994.

== See also ==
- Index of North Carolina–related articles
- List of people from North Carolina
- Outline of North Carolina

== Works cited ==
- Lee, James Melvin (1923). History of American journalism. Boston, New York, Houghton Mifflin Company. (Alternative publication)
- Powell, William S., ed. (2000). Dictionary of North Carolina biography. Vol. II. University of North Carolina Press. ISBN 978-0-8078-67013. - link to Davis biography
- Lefler, Hugh (numerous editions since 1934). North Carolina History Told by Contemporaries . University of North Carolina Press.
- Jones, H. G. (1984). North Carolina Illustrated, 1524–1984. University of North Carolina Press.
- North Carolina Manual. Published biennially by the Department of the Secretary of State since 1941.
- The Religion in North Carolina Digital Collection. A grant-funded project to provide digital access to publications of and about religious bodies in North Carolina. Partner institutions at Duke University, UNC-Chapel Hill, and Wake Forest University contributed the largest portion of the items in this collection, but the collection is enriched by unique materials from libraries and archives throughout North Carolina. The materials in this collection include local church histories, periodicals, clergy biographies, cookbooks, event programs, directories, and much more.

Preceded by New York	List of U.S. states by date of admission to the Union; Ratified Constitution on November 21, 1789 (12th)	Succeeded by Rhode Island
