= Index of North Carolina–related articles =

The location of the state of North Carolina in the United States of America

The following is an alphabetical list of articles, categories, and lists related to the U.S. state of North Carolina.

== 0–9 ==
- .nc.us – Internet second-level domain for the state of North Carolina
- 12th state to ratify the Constitution of the United States of America

== A ==
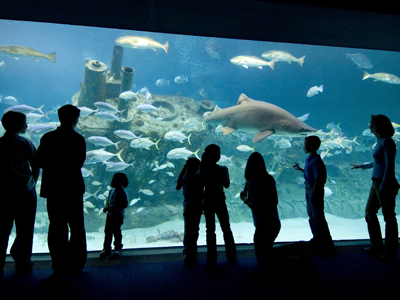
Charlotte Aquarium

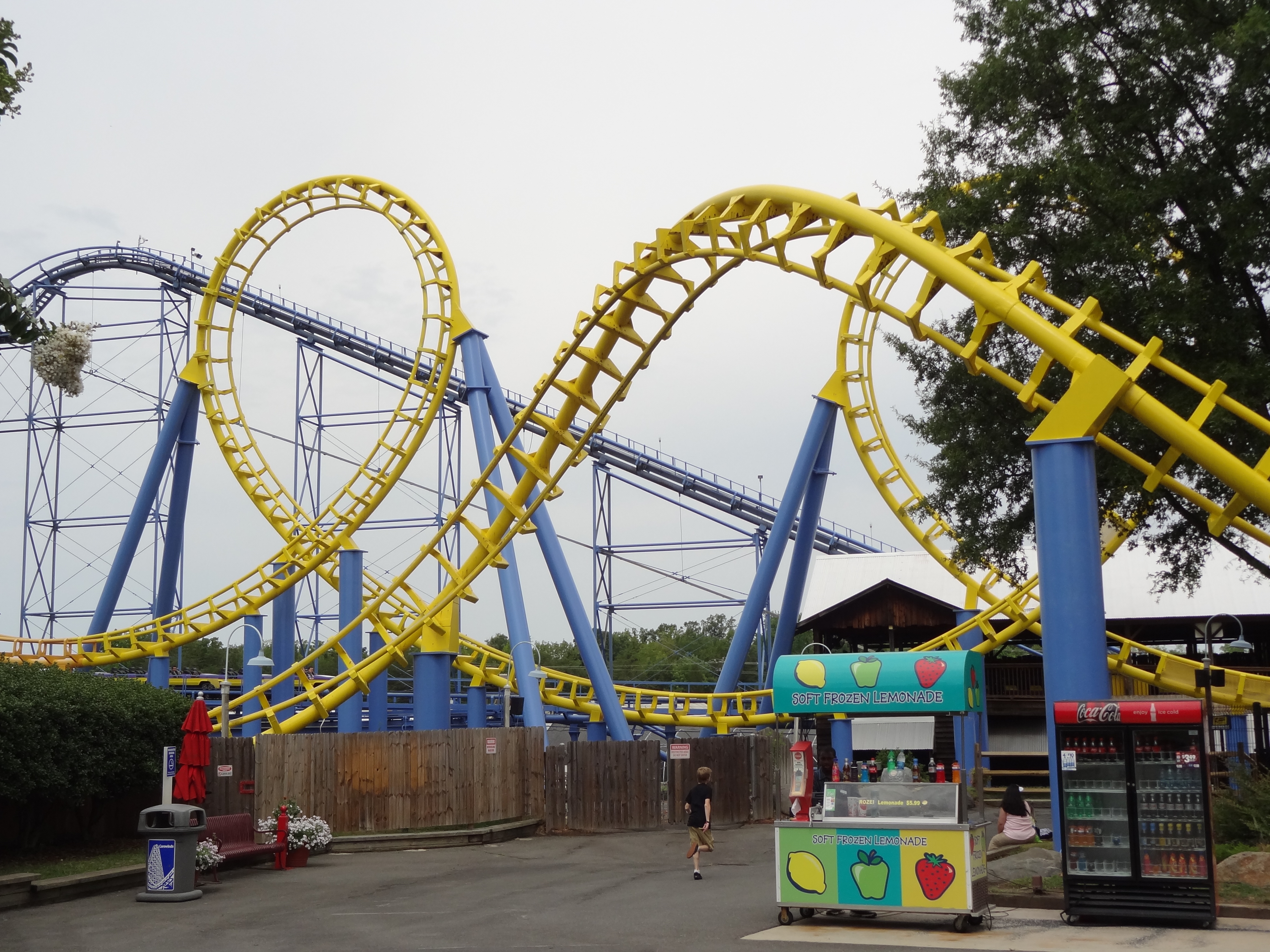
Amusement Park Carowinds, Carolina Cyclone

- Adjacent states: (Commonwealth of Virginia, State of Georgia, State of South Carolina, State of Tennessee)
- Age of juvenile jurisdiction, North Carolina
- Agriculture in North Carolina
- American Revolutionary War, 1775–1783
- American Revolution, History of North Carolina
- Amusement parks in North Carolina
- Animal Protection Act, North Carolina
- Appalachia
- Aquaria in North Carolina, Category (commons:Category:Aquaria in North Carolina)
- Arboreta in North Carolina, Category (commons:Category:Arboreta in North Carolina)
- Archaeology of North Carolina (Category:Archaeological sites in North Carolina(commons:Category:Archaeological sites in North Carolina)
- Architecture of North Carolina
- Art museums and galleries in North Carolina, category (commons:Category:Art museums and galleries in North Carolina)
- Asheville, North Carolina
- Astronomical observatories in North Carolina, Category (commons:Category:Astronomical observatories in North Carolina)
- Attorney General of North Carolina
- Auditor of North Carolina
- Award, North Carolina

== B ==
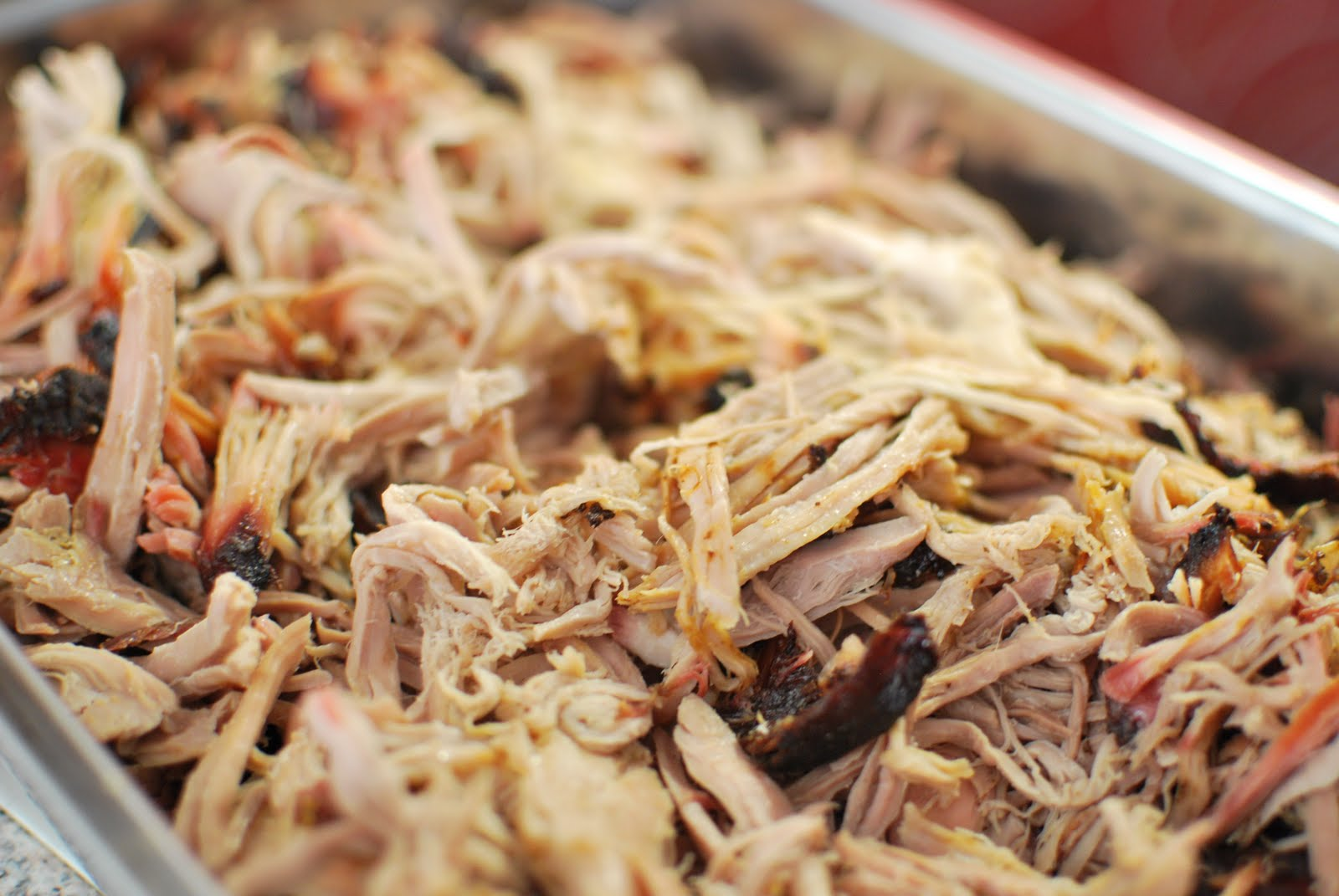
Barbecue

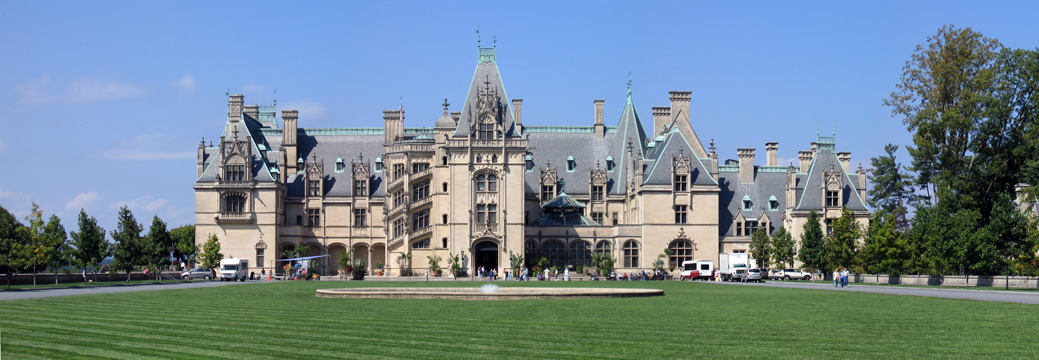
Biltmore Estate

- Barbecue in North Carolina
- Beaches of North Carolina (commons:Category:Beaches of North Carolina)
- Black Film Festival, North Carolina
- Botanical gardens in North Carolina (commons:Category:Botanical gardens in North Carolina)
- Buildings and structures in North Carolina (commons:Category:Buildings and structures in North Carolina)
- Biltmore Estate (commons:Category:Biltmore Estate)
- Blowing Rock, North Carolina (commons:Category:Blowing Rock, North Carolina)
- Boys Choir, North Carolina

== C ==
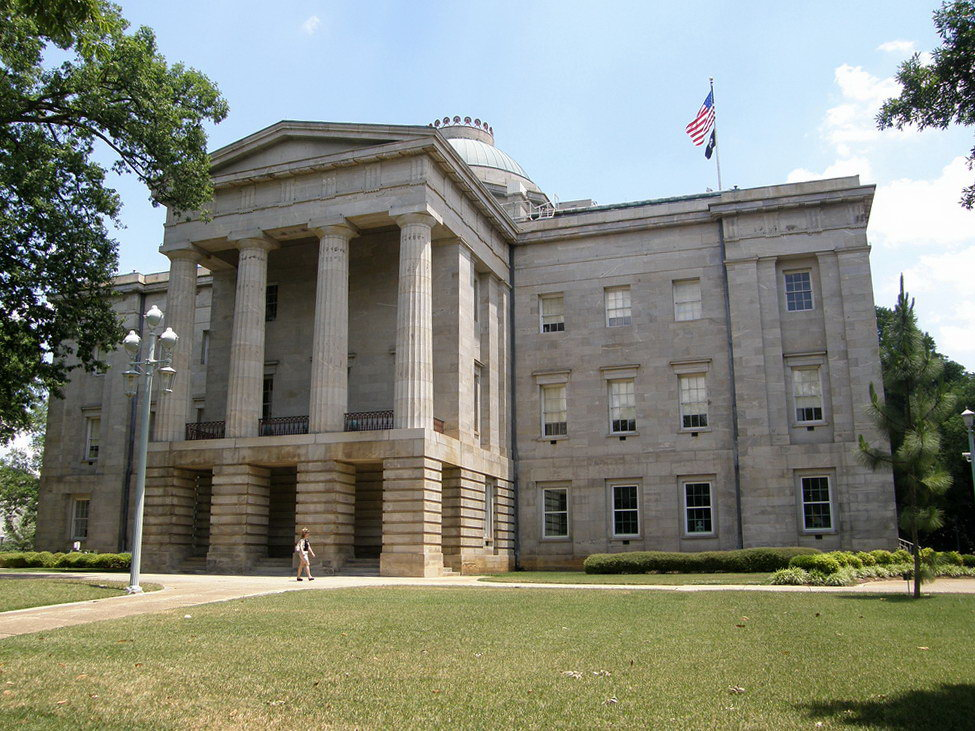
The North Carolina State Capitol in Raleigh

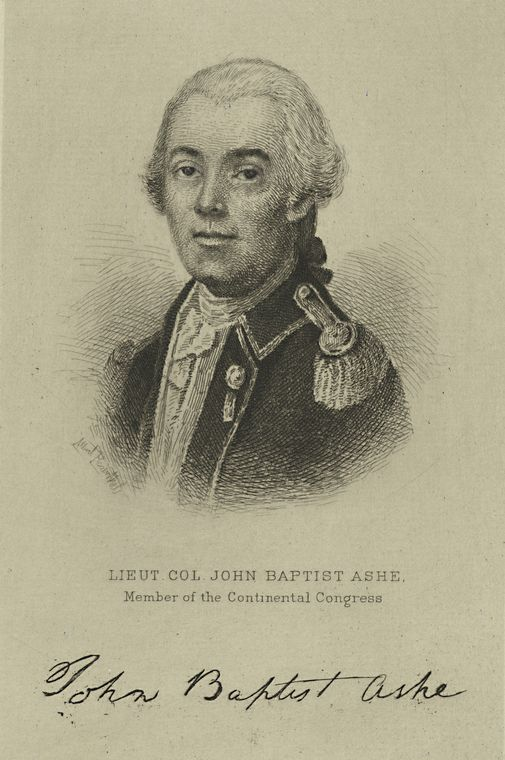
Congressman John Baptista Ashe

- Cabinet of North Carolina
- Capitol of the State of North Carolina (commons:Category:North Carolina State Capitol)
- Capital Area Metropolitan Planning Organization, North Carolina
- Caves of North Carolina (commons:Category:Caves of North Carolina)
- Census statistical areas, North Carolina
- Census Designated Places in North Carolina, category
- Center for the Advancement of Teaching Education, North Carolina
- Cessions, Western territorial claims (1784)
- Charlotte, North Carolina
- Cherokee–American wars (1776–1794)
- Cities in North Carolina, category
- Civil War, North Carolina, 1861–1865
- Climate of North Carolina (Category:Climate of North Carolina, commons:Category:Climate of North Carolina)
- Communications in North Carolina, category (commons:Category:Communications in North Carolina)
- Commission on Interracial Cooperation, North Carolina
- Commissioner of Agriculture
- Commissioner of Insurance
- Commissioner of Labor
- Companies in North Carolina, category
- Confederate States of America
- Congressional delegations
- Congressional districts
- Constitution of North Carolina
- Convention centers in North Carolina, category (commons:Category:Convention centers in North Carolina)
- Council of State of North Carolina
- Courts of North Carolina
- Culture of North Carolina, category (commons:Category:North Carolina culture)

== D ==
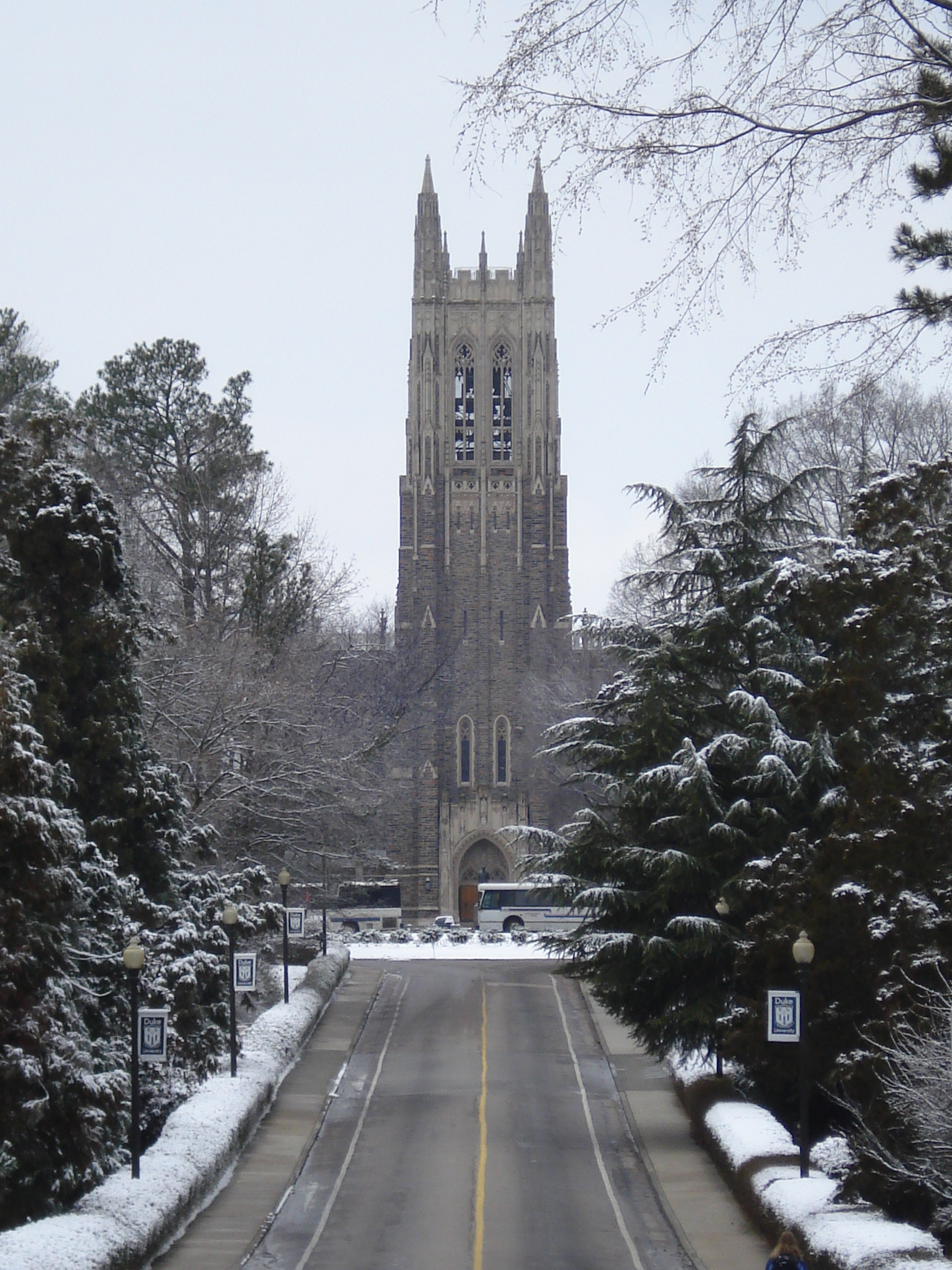
Duke Chapel

- Demographics of North Carolina
- Department of Revenue, North Carolina
- Department of Commerce, North Carolina
- Department of Environmental Quality, North Carolina
- Department of Military and Veterans Affairs, North Carolina
- Department of Natural and Cultural Resources, North Carolina
- Department of Public Safety, North Carolina
- Department of Revenue, North Carolina
- Department of Transfortation, North Carolina
- Duke Chapel
- Durham, North Carolina

== E ==
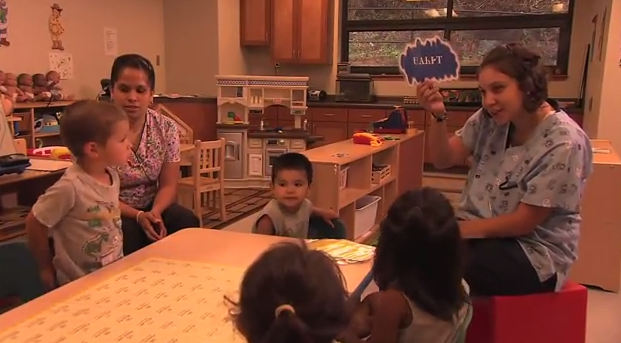
Education: Kituwah Academy

- Economy of North Carolina (Category:Economy of North Carolina, commons:Category:Economy of North Carolina)
- Education in North Carolina (Category:Education in North Carolina, commons:Category:Education in North Carolina)
- Education Lottery, North Carolina
- Category:Elections in North Carolina (commons:Category:Elections in North Carolina)
- Category:Environment of North Carolina (commons:Category:Environment of North Carolina)

== F ==
The Flag of the State of North Carolina

- Fayetteville Convention Constitutional Convention of 1789
- Ferry System, North Carolina
- Festivals in North Carolina, category (commons:Category:Festivals in North Carolina)
- Flag of the State of North Carolina
- la Florida (Spanish colony, 1565–1763
- Fort Bragg, North Carolina
- Franklin, State of
- French and Indian War (1754–1763)

== G ==
The Great Seal of the State of North Carolina

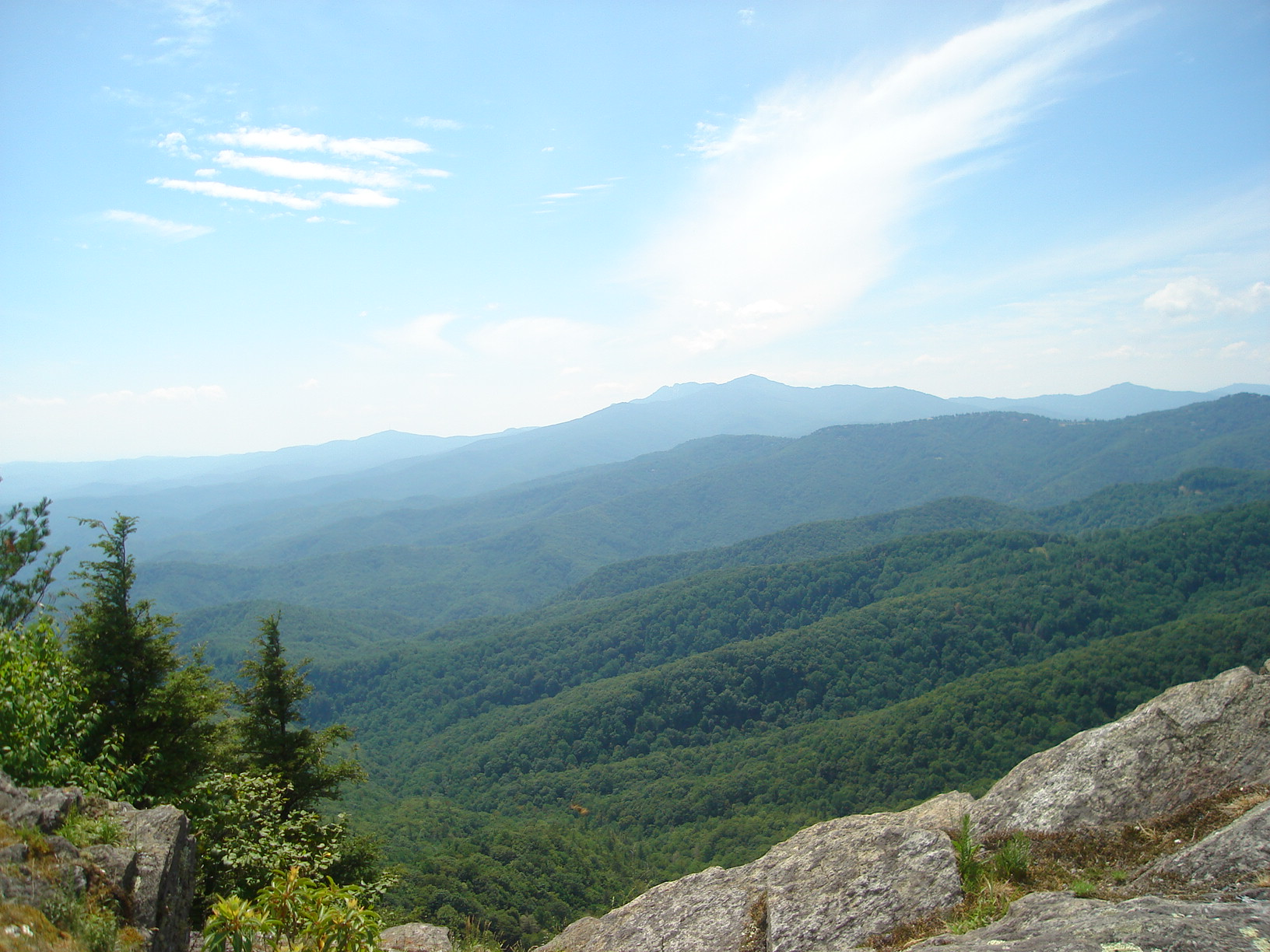
Blowing Rock

- Gambling in North Carolina
- General Assembly (Legislative branch) of North Carolina
- Geography of North Carolina (Category:Geography of North Carolina, commons:Category:Geography of North Carolina)
- Geology of North Carolina, category (commons:Category:Geology of North Carolina)
- Category:Ghost towns in North Carolina (commons:Category:Ghost towns in North Carolina)
- Golf clubs and courses in North Carolina, category
- Government of North Carolina (Category:Government of North Carolina, commons:Category:Government of North Carolina)
- Governor of the State of North Carolina
- Great Seal of the State of North Carolina
- Great Smoky Mountains National Park
- Greensboro, North Carolina

== H ==
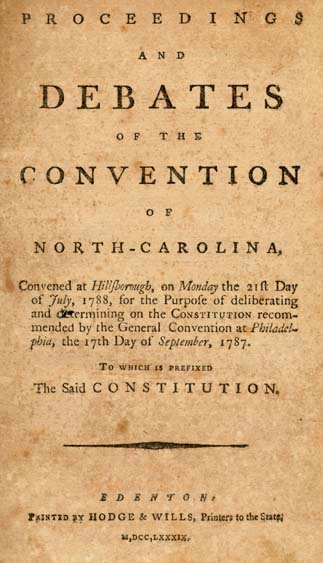
Hillsborough Convention Minutes

- Health in North Carolina, category
- Heritage railroads in North Carolina, category (commons:Category:Heritage railroads in North Carolina)
- North Carolina State Highway Patrol
- Highway system, North Carolina
- Hiking trails in North Carolina (commons:Category:Hiking trails in North Carolina)
- Hillsborough Convention Constitution Convention of 1788
- History of North Carolina (Category:History of North Carolina, commons:Category:History of North Carolina)
- History of slavery in North Carolina
- Hot springs of North Carolina, category (commons:Category:Hot springs of North Carolina)
- Home Economics Association, North Carolina
- House Bill 11, North Carolina
- House of Commons/Representatives of North Carolina
- Hurricane recovery in North Carolina

== I ==
- Images of North Carolina, category (commons:Category:North Carolina)
- Indian Reserve (1763), British
- Indigenous peoples of North Carolina

== J ==
- Joara people (1567–1568)

== K ==
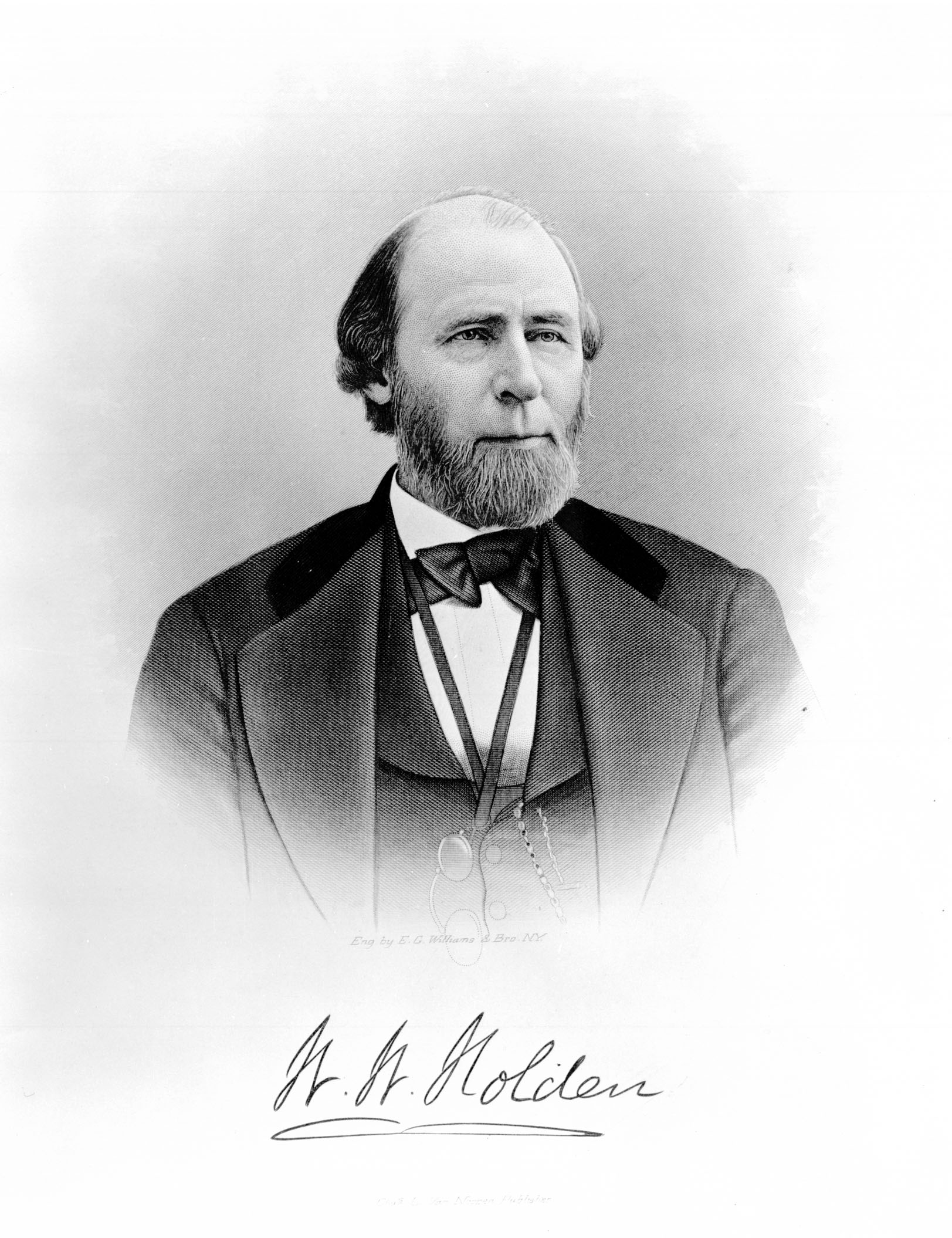
Gov. William Holden

- Kirk-Holden war
- Ku Klux Klan

== L ==
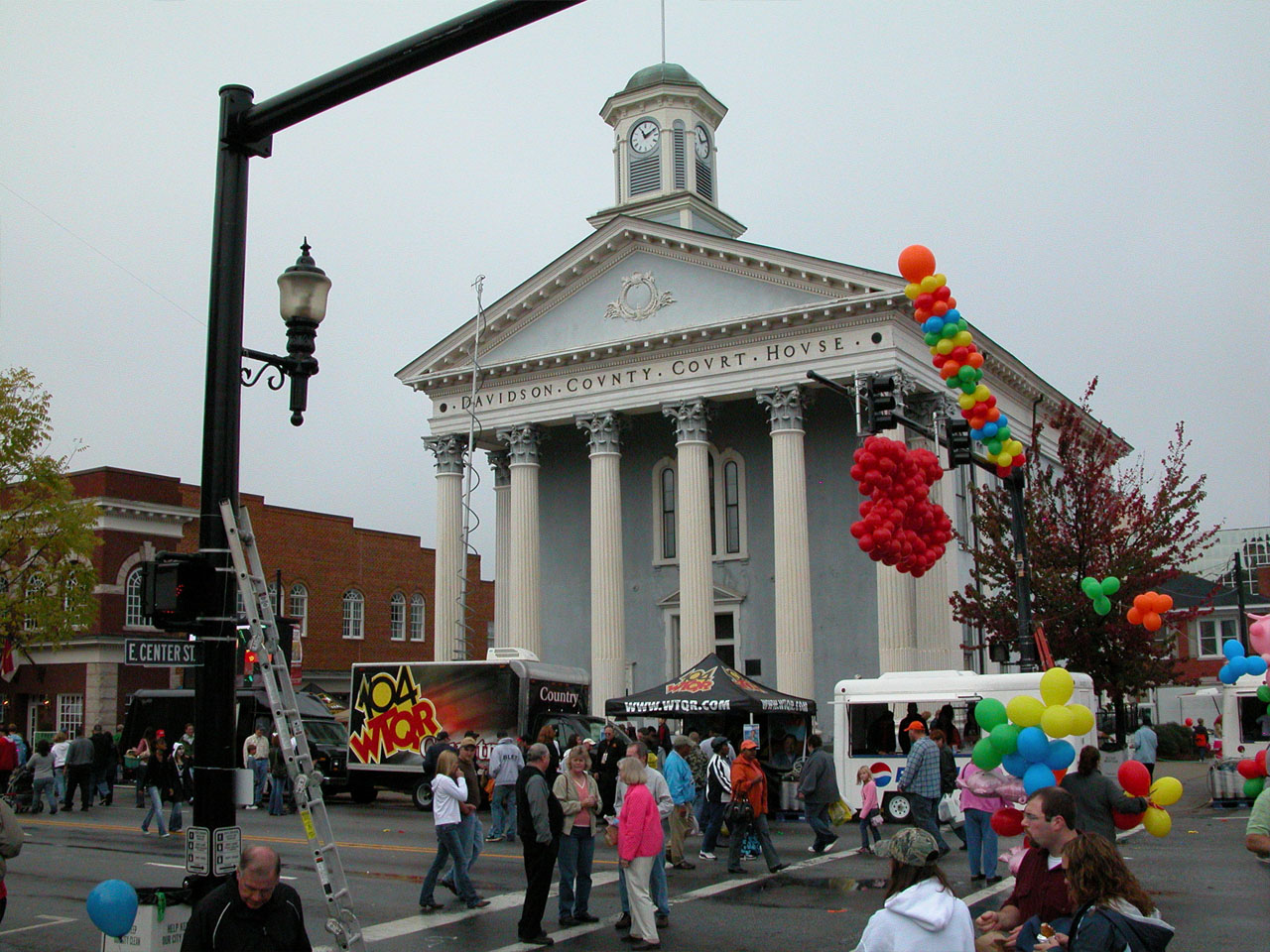
Lexington Barbecue Festival

- Lakes of North Carolina, category (commons:Category:Lakes of North Carolina)
- Landmarks in North Carolina, category (commons:Category:Landmarks in North Carolina)
- Lexington Barbecue Festival
- Lieutenant Governor of the State of North Carolina
- Louisiana (New France), French colony of 1699–1763
- Lowry War

=== Lists ===
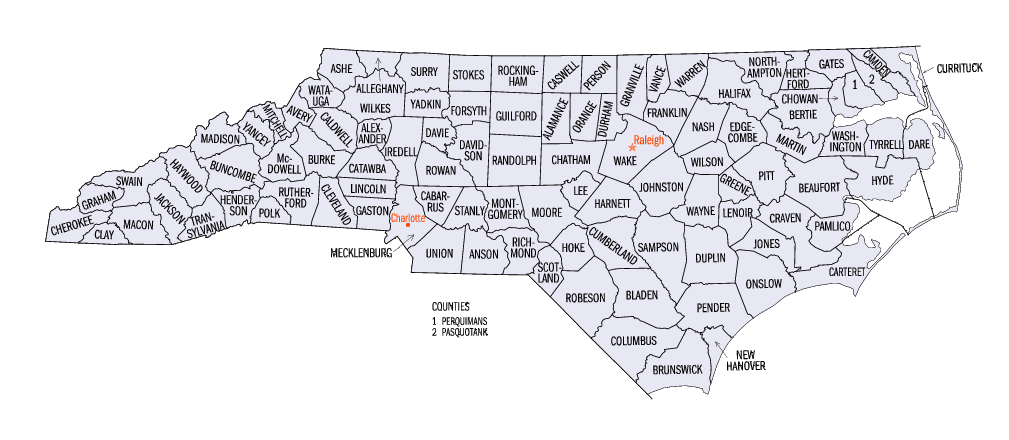
An enlargeable map of the 100 counties of the State of North Carolina

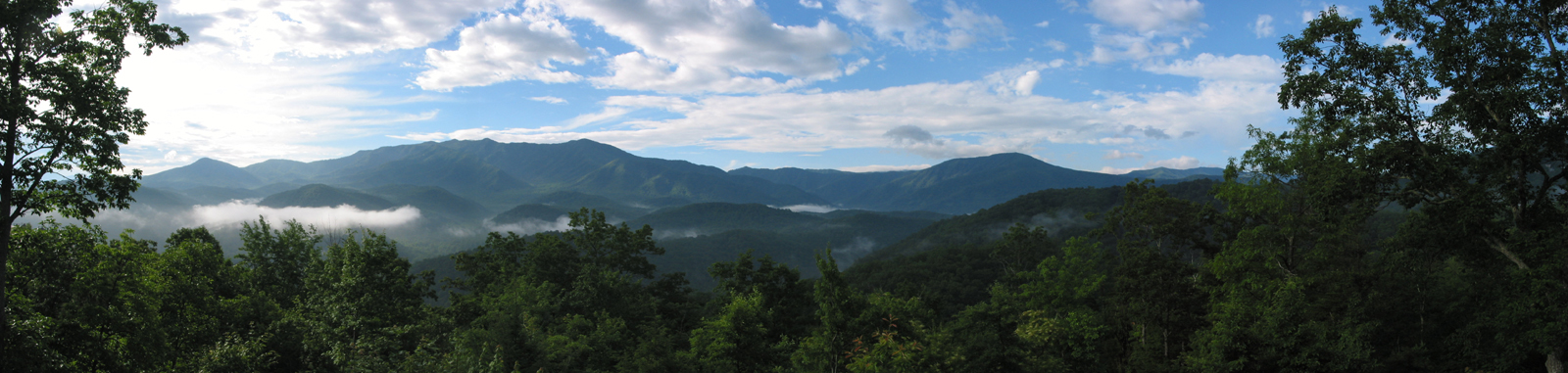
Great Smoky Mountain National Park

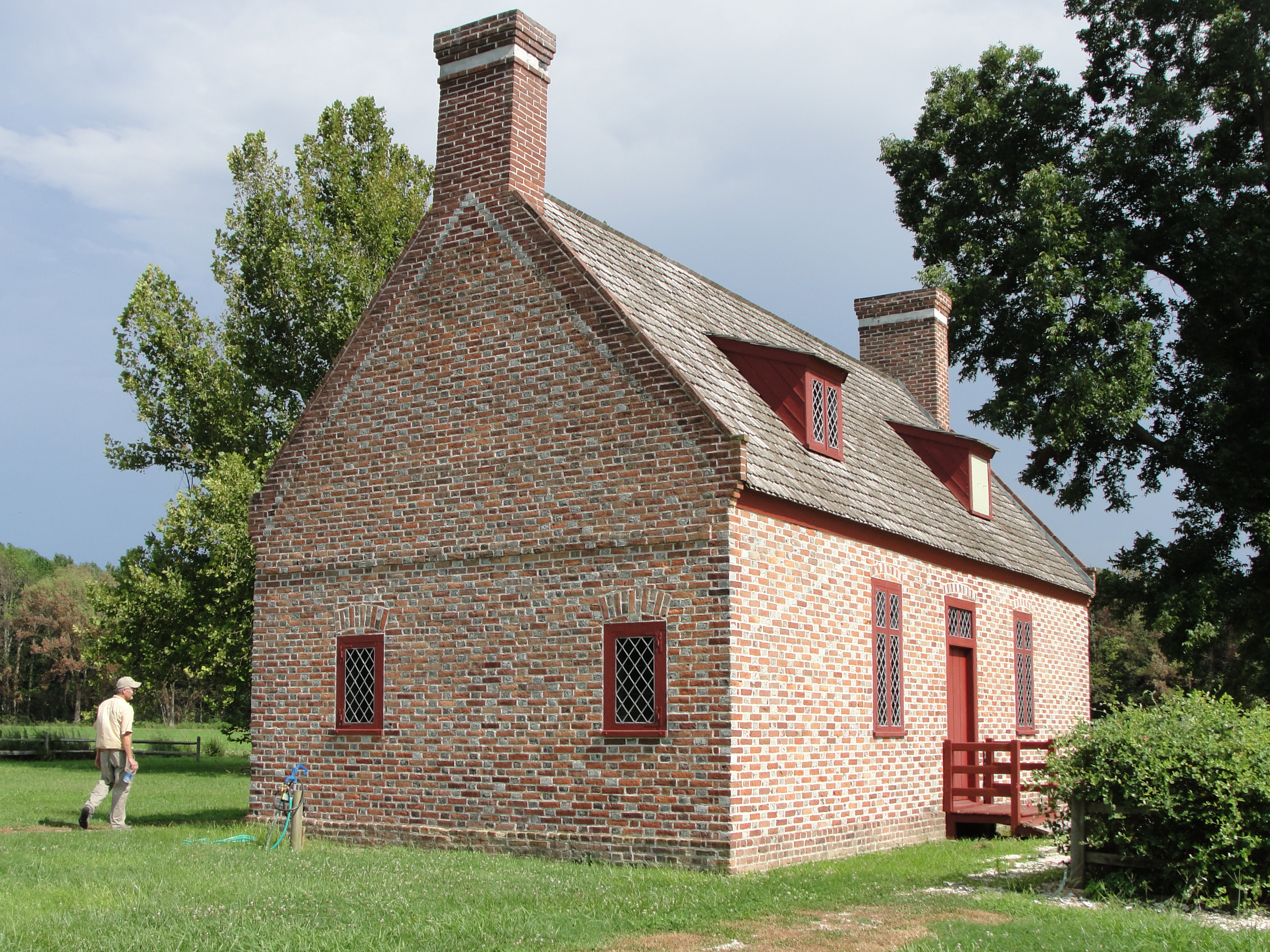
Newbold-White Plantation

- Lists related to the State of North Carolina, category
- List of airports in North Carolina
- List of North Carolina area codes
- List of cities, towns, and villages in North Carolina (commons:Category:Cities in North Carolina)
- List of colleges and universities in North Carolina (commons:Category:Universities and colleges in North Carolina)
- List of counties in North Carolina
- List of North Carolina county seats )commons:Category:Counties in North Carolina)
- List of dams and reservoirs in North Carolina
- List of famous North Carolinians
- List of festivals in North Carolina
- List of forts in North Carolina (Category:Forts in North Carolina, commons:Category:Forts in North Carolina)
- List of ghost towns in North Carolina
- List of governors of North Carolina
- List of high schools in North Carolina
- List of hospitals in North Carolina
- List of individuals executed in North Carolina
- List of islands of North Carolina
- List of lakes in North Carolina
- List of law enforcement agencies in North Carolina
- List of metropolitan areas of North Carolina
- List of museums in North Carolina (Category:Museums in North Carolina)(commons:Category:Museums in North Carolina)
- List of National Historic Landmarks in North Carolina
- List of National Park Service areas in North Carolina
- List of newspapers in North Carolina
- List of North Carolina hurricanes
- List of North Carolina militia units in the American Revolution
- List of North Carolina state legislatures
- List of plantations in North Carolina
- List of people from North Carolina (category, commons:Category:People from North Carolina)
- List of power stations in North Carolina
- List of radio stations in North Carolina
- List of North Carolina railroads
- List of Registered Historic Places in North Carolina
- List of rivers of North Carolina
- List of North Carolina Scenic Byways
- List of school districts in North Carolina
- List of U.S. state abbreviations
- List of state forests in North Carolina
- List of North Carolina state legislatures
- List of state parks in North Carolina
- List of state prisons in North Carolina
- List of symbols of the State of North Carolina
- List of North Carolina state symbols (Category:Symbols of North Carolina (commons:Category:Symbols of North Carolina)
- List of Superfund sites in North Carolina
- List of telephone area codes in North Carolina
- List of television stations in North Carolina
- List of unincorporated communities in North Carolina (Unincorporated communities in North Carolina, category
- List of United States representatives from North Carolina
- List of United States senators from North Carolina

== M ==
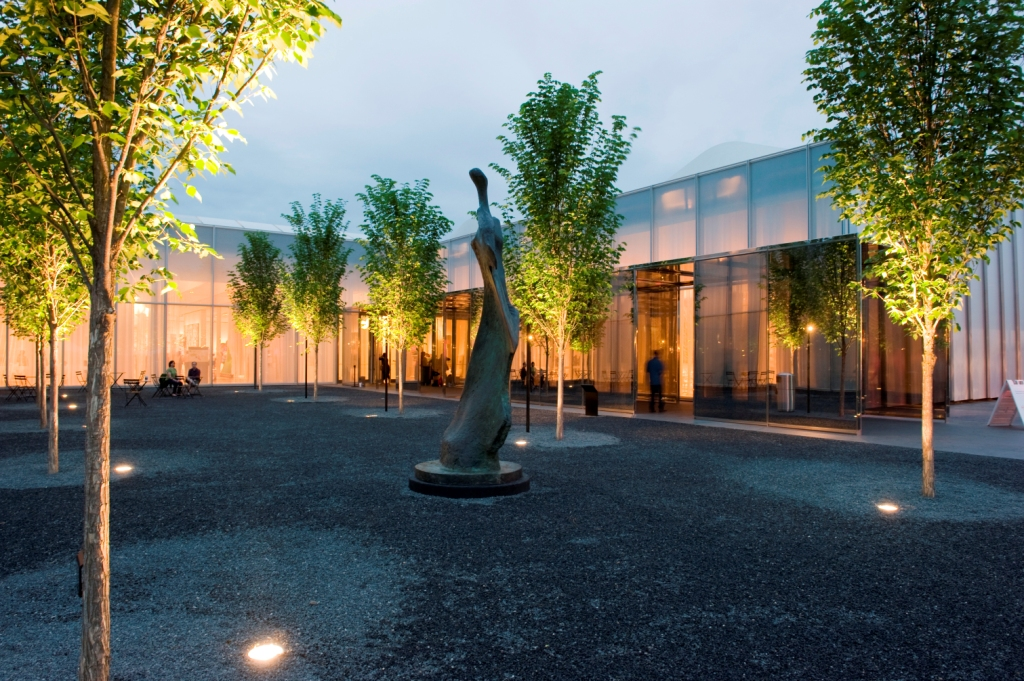
North Carolina Museum of Art

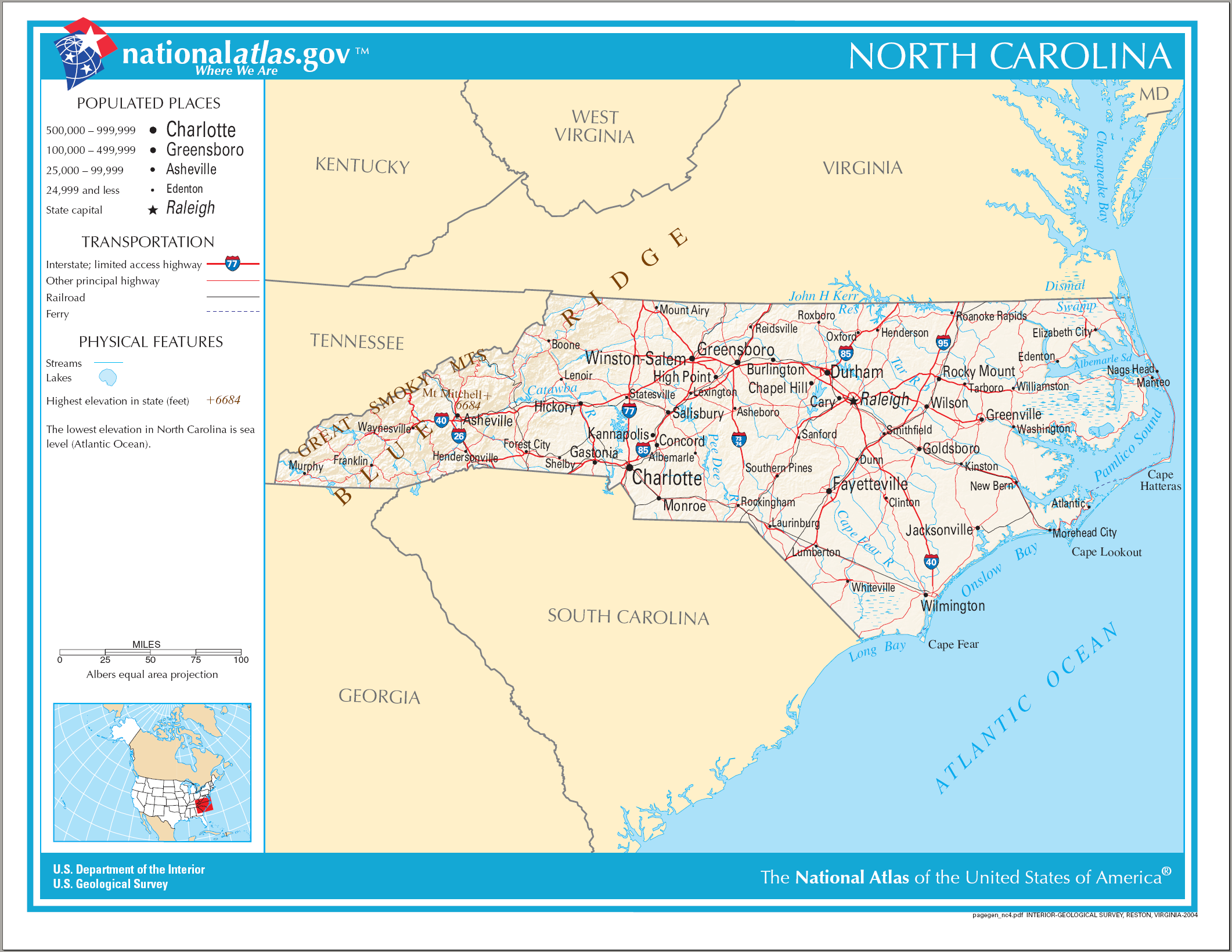
Enlargeable map of North Carolina

- Maps of North Carolina, category (commons:Category:Maps of North Carolina)
- Mass media in North Carolina
- Monuments and memorials in North Carolina, category (commons:Category:Monuments and memorials in North Carolina)
- Mississippian culture of North Carolina
- Municipalities in North Carolina, category
- North Carolina Museum of Art
- Music of North Carolina (commons:Category:Music of North Carolina, Category:Musical groups from North Carolina
- Musicians from North Carolina, category

== N ==
- National forests of North Carolina, category (commons:Category:National Forests of North Carolina)
- Natural gas pipelines in North Carolina, category
- Natural history of North Carolina, category (commons:Category:Natural history of North Carolina)
- New Bern, North Carolina, early capital (1712–1794)
- North Carolina (Category:North Carolina, commons:Category:North Carolina

== O ==
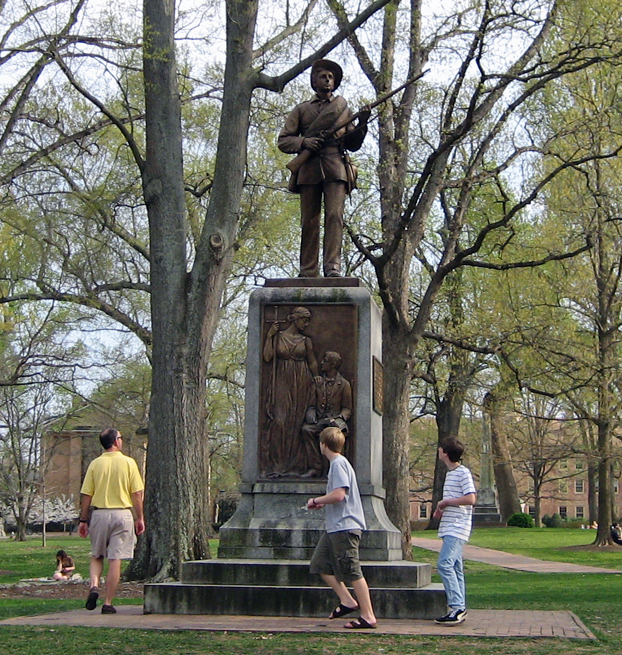
Outdoor sculpture: Silent Sam before it was toppled

- Order of the Long Leaf Pine
- Outdoor sculptures in North Carolina, category (commons:Category:Outdoor sculptures in North Carolina)

== P ==
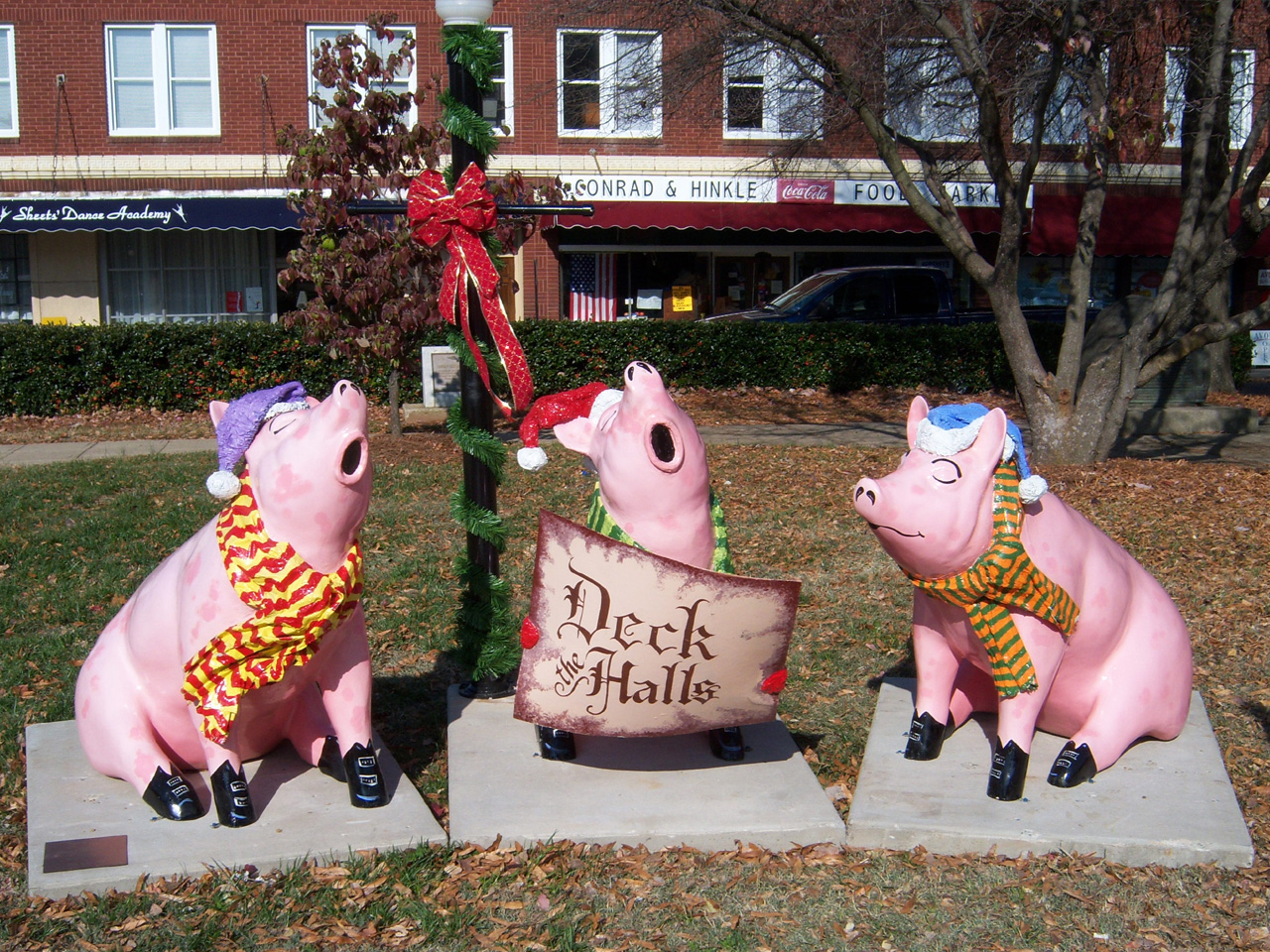
Pigs in the City

- Parks and Recreation Trust Fund, North Carolina
- People from North Carolina by populated place, category
- People from North Carolina by county, category
- People from North Carolina by occupation, category
- Piedmont Land Conservancy
- Pigs in the City
- Politics of North Carolina
- Protected areas of North Carolina, category (commons:Category:Protected areas of North Carolina)
- Province of Carolina (English, 1663–1707)
- Province of Carolina (British, 1707–1712)
- Province of North Carolina (British, 1712–1776)
- North Carolina Provincial Congress
- Public Radio Association, North Carolina
- Pulled pork

== Q ==
- Quaker Gap Township, Stokes County, North Carolina

== R ==
- Railroad museums in North Carolina (commons:Category:Railroad museums in North Carolina)
- Raleigh, North Carolina, state capital since 1794
- Reconstruction, North Carolina (1865–1868)
- Religion in North Carolina (Category:Religion in North Carolina, commons:Category:Religion in North Carolina)
- Rivers of North Carolina (commons:Category:Rivers of North Carolina)
- Roanoke Colony (English colony)
- Royal Proclamation of 1763
- Rowan Resolves 1774

== S ==
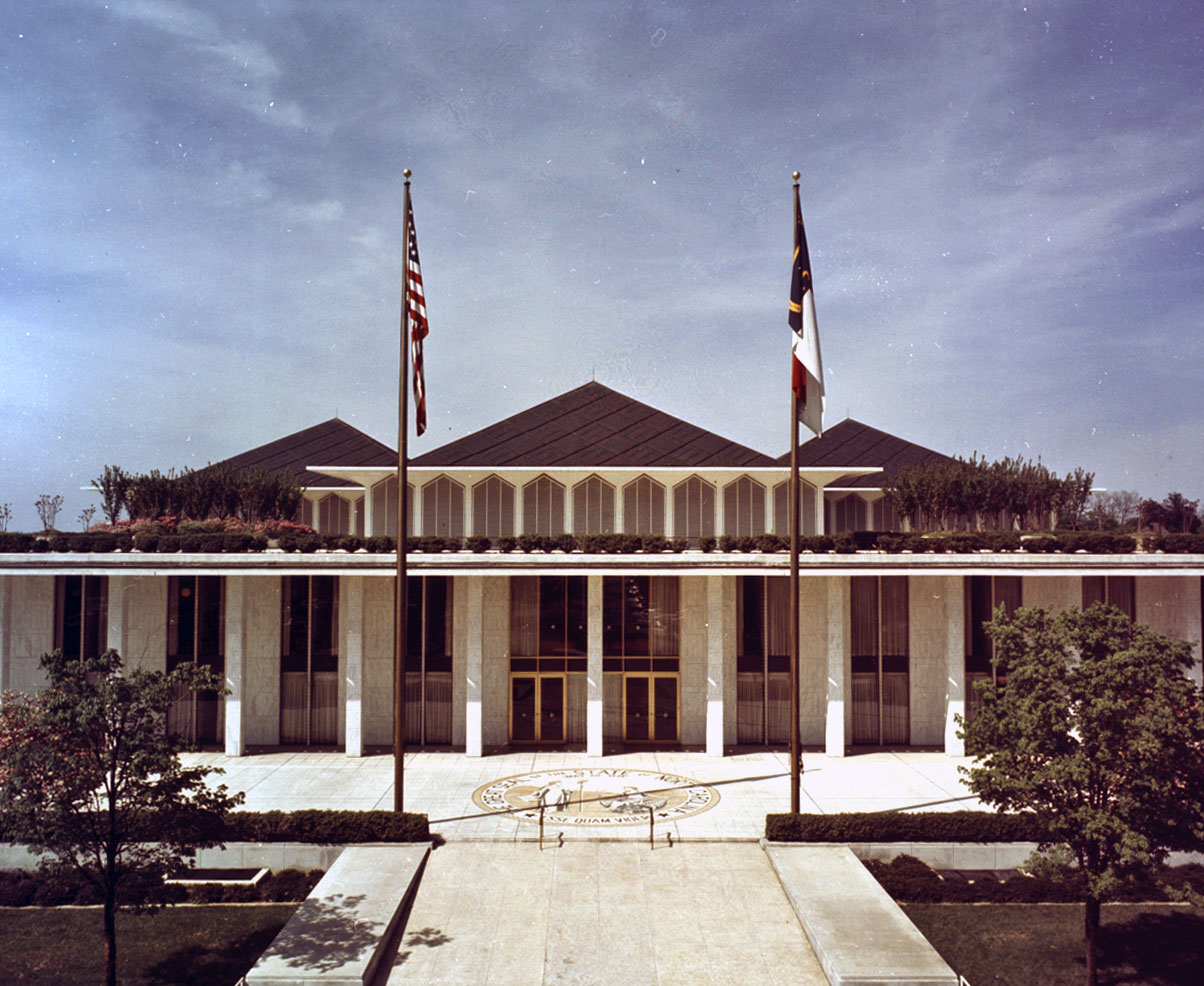
State Legislative Building, Raleigh

- Safety and Emission Vehicle Inspection, North Carolina
- Scouting in North Carolina
- Secretary of State of North Carolina
- Senate of the State of North Carolina
- School Violence Prevention Act, North Carolina
- Senate of North Carolina
- Solar power in North Carolina
- Sports in North Carolina (Category:Sports in North Carolina, commons:Category:Sports in North Carolina)
- Sports venues in North Carolina, category (commons:Category:Sports venues in North Carolina)
- State Capitol, North Carolina
- State House, North Carolina
- State legislative building, North Carolina
- Statesville, North Carolina
- Structured Sentencing Act, North Carolina
- Sullivan Acts, North Carolina
- Superintendent of Public Instruction of North Carolina
- Supreme Court of North Carolina

== T ==
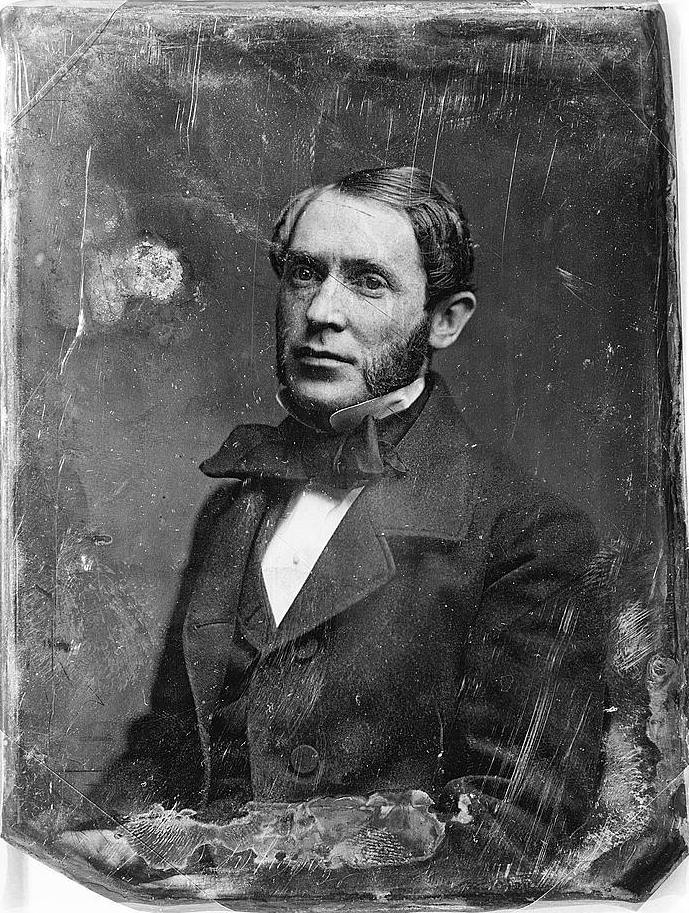
State Treasurer John Hill Wheeler

- Telecommunications in North Carolina, category (commons:Category:Communications in North Carolina)
- Television shows set in North Carolina. category
- Tennessee Valley Authority
- Theatres in North Carolina, category (commons:Category:Theatres in North Carolina)
- Tourism in North Carolina, category (commons:Category:Tourism in North Carolina)
- Towns in North Carolina, category
- Townships in North Carolina, category
- Trailblazers, North Carolina
- Trail of Tears (1830–1838)
- Transportation in North Carolina (Category:Transportation in North Carolina, commons:Category:Transport in North Carolina)
- Treasurer of North Carolina
- Treaty of Fontainebleau of 1762
- Treaty of Paris (1763)
- Treaty of Paris (1783)

== U ==
- United States
  - United States Court of Appeals for the Fourth Circuit
  - United States Declaration of Independence of 1776
  - United States District Court for the Eastern District of North Carolina
  - United States District Court for the Middle District of North Carolina
  - United States District Court for the Western District of North Carolina
  - North Carolina's congressional delegations
  - North Carolina's congressional districts
- Urban League of Central Carolinas
- US-NC – ISO 3166-2:US region code for the State of North Carolina

== V ==
- Villages in North Carolina, category

== W ==
WikiProject: North Carolina

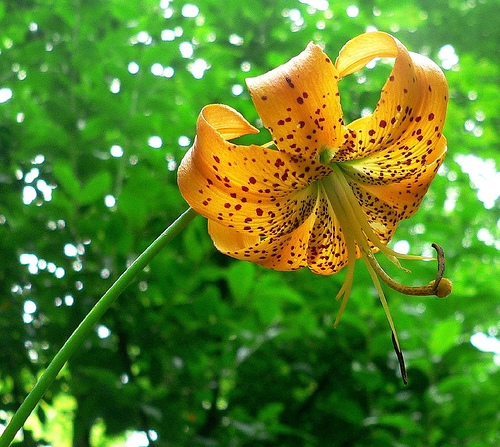
Wildlife: Turk's Cap (Lilium Superbum)

- War of 1812 (1812–1815)
- Water parks in North Carolina, category
- Waterfalls of North Carolina (Category:Waterfalls of North Carolina, commons:Category:Waterfalls of North Carolina)
- Wikimedia
  - Wikimedia Commons:Category:North Carolina
  - commons:Category:Maps of North Carolina
  - Wikinews:Category:North Carolina
- Wikinews:Portal:North Carolina
- Wikipedia:WikiProject North Carolina
  - Category:WikiProject North Carolina articles
  - Category:WikiProject North Carolina participants
- Wildlife of North Carolina
- Wilmington, North Carolina
- Wind power in North Carolina
- Wine Festival, North Carolina
- Winston-Salem, North Carolina
- Women's Right to Know Act, North Carolina

== Y ==
- Yancey County, North Carolina

== Z ==
- Zoos in North Carolina (commons:Category:Zoos in North Carolina)

== See also ==
- Topic overview:
  - North Carolina
  - Outline of North Carolina
