= North Carolina Public Radio Association =

The North Carolina Public Radio Association is a statewide collaborative of sixteen public radio stations.

The association members include:

- Public Radio East, New Bern Public Radio for Eastern North Carolina
- WCPE, Raleigh The Classical Station
- WCQS, Asheville The Mountain Air Network
- WDAV, Davidson 89.9 Classical Public Radio
- WFAE, Charlotte's NPR News Source
- WFDD, The Piedmont and High Country's Public Radio Station
- WFSS, Fayetteville NPR News & Jazz Music
- WHQR, Wilmington Radio with Vision...Listen & See
- WNCU, Durham Jazz Radio
- WNCW, Spindale Broadcasting a World of Music
- WRVS-FM, Elizabeth City Your Community Voice
- WUNC (FM), Chapel Hill North Carolina Public Radio
