= North Carolina Parks and Recreation Trust Fund =

The North Carolina General Assembly established the Parks and Recreation Trust Fund (PARTF) in 1994 to fund improvements in the state's park system, fund grants for local governments and increase public access to state beaches. The Parks and Recreation Authority, a fifteen-member appointed board, was also created to allocate funds from PARTF to the state parks and to the grants program for local governments.

The fund was created by North Carolina General Assembly Senate Bill 733. The impetus for the bill was a 1988 legislative study which determined that state parks were underfunded. A bond issue quickly ensued, raising $35 million to purchase land and build visitor centers in the state park system. The legislature seized upon the momentum and widespread support from the business and tourism sectors to get the bill passed.

The Parks and Recreation Authority, who administers the funds, has a dedicated revenue stream from an annual 75% share of the N.C. real estate transfer tax. 65% of the money must be allocated to acquire land, complete capital projects, or make repairs to the state park system, 30% must be used to provide local government agencies with dollar-for-dollar grants to be used in the same fashion, 5% is for the Public Beach and Coastal Waterfront Access Program and up to 3% can be used by the Department of Environment and Natural Resources (DENR) for grant administration purposes.

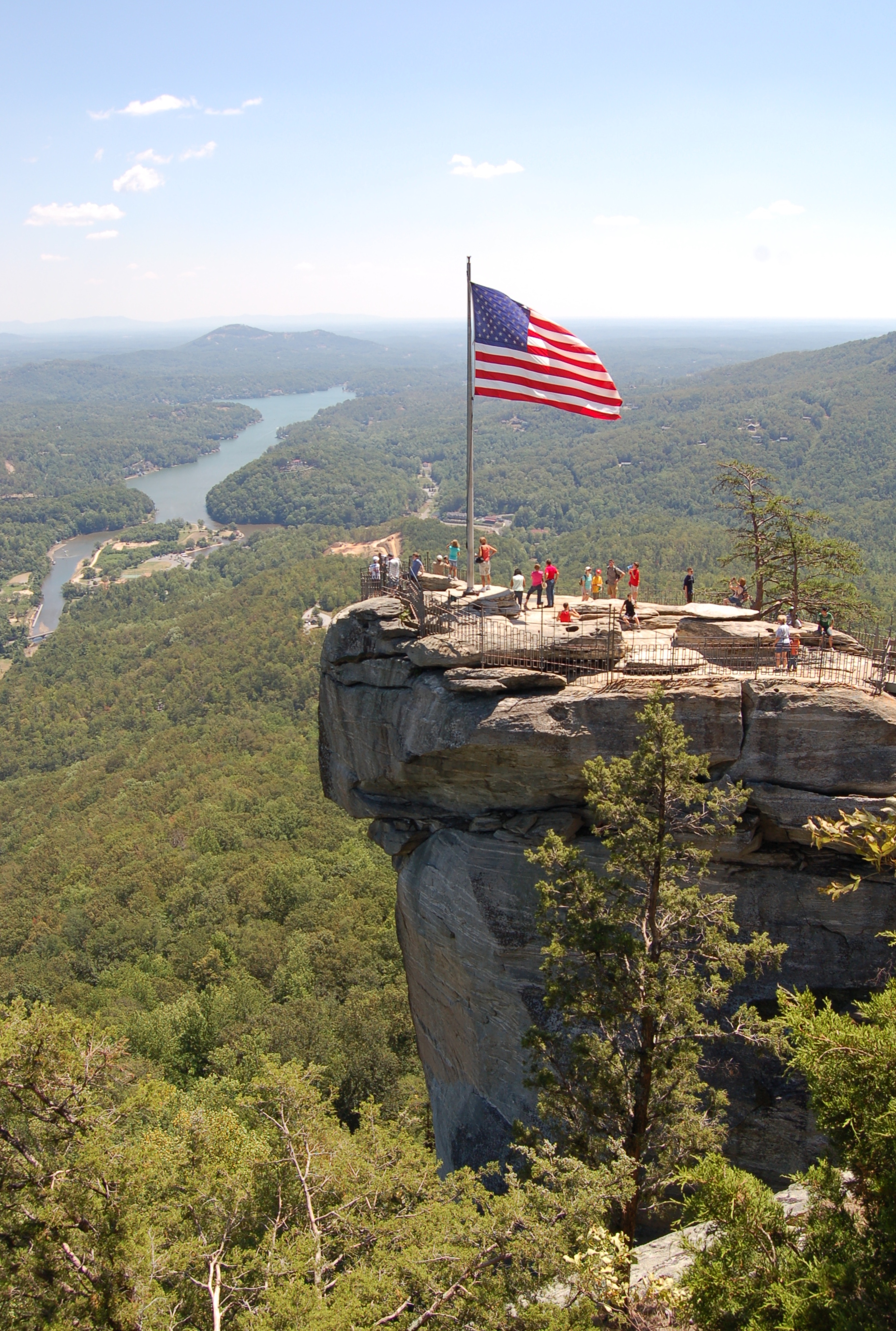
Chimney Rock State Park in Rutherford County was a 2010 recipient of PARTF funds as part of a $2.3 million upgrade to facilities and trails.

== Purpose ==
The purpose of the Park and Recreation Trust Fund is to provide matching grants, of up to $500,000, to local governmental agencies for recreational purposes. Awarded funds are to be used to acquire land for recreational use, to protect the state's natural resources, and to build or renovate recreational facilities. Donations of fairly appraised land may be used by grantees as their financial match. A portion of PARTF is the primary funding source for the Public Beach and Coastal Waterfront Access Program. The program, administered by the Division of Coastal Management (DCM), offers matching grants to local governments throughout North Carolina's twenty coastal counties. These funds are to be used to improve public access to beaches and coastal areas.

== Funding ==
The primary funding source for the trust fund is the N.C. excise tax on real estate transfers. This tax, which generated almost $24 million of revenue in 2011, is levied on each "deed, instrument, or writing by which interest in real property is conveyed to another person." The tax is levied at the rate of one dollar on each $500 of the interest or property conveyed. Each county remits one-half of the proceeds, less the county's allowance for administrative expenses, to the state. The Department of Revenue credits 75 percent of the excise tax revenues to the Parks and Recreation Trust Fund and 25 percent to the Natural Heritage Trust Fund. Additional PARTF revenue, $1.8 million in 2011, is allocated from a portion of the fees from personalized license plates as well as investment earnings credited to the assets of the fund.

== Governing structure ==
The Park and Recreation Trust Fund is governed by the 15-member North Carolina Parks and Recreation Authority. Five members, including the chair, are appointed by the governor with ten being recommended by the General Assembly. Members are appointed for three-year terms and may serve no more than two consecutive terms. After serving two consecutive terms, a member is not eligible for appointment to the Authority for at least one year after the expiration of the member's last term. The Authority is charged with six powers and duties:

1. to receive public and private donations and funds for deposit into the trust fund
2. to allocate funds for land acquisition
3. to allocate funds for capital projects
4. to solicit financial and material support
5. to develop effective support for parks and recreation; and
6. to advise the Secretary of DENR on any matter he may refer to the body.

== Application and selection process ==
In August of each year, the Parks and Recreation Authority notifies local governments that the funding cycle is open, applications are available, and the educational workshop has been scheduled. In September, the Recreation Resource Service holds a state wide video conference to educate agencies on the granting process. They are also available to eligible agencies for technical assistance and advice year round. Applications are due by the end of January the following year, with grant awards notification following in May.

Each project is evaluated and scored by a team of PARTF staff and regional consultants from the Recreation Resources Service. Then, The Parks and Recreation Authority selects which applicants will receive funding based on the following factors:

- the criteria contained in the scoring system
- the geographic distribution of projects across the state
- the presence or absence of other funding sources
- the population of the applicant
- the level of compliance with prior grant agreements
- the grant amount being requested by the applicant
- the PARTF funds available for all grant applications

== Grant awards and community benefits ==
In 2011, eighty local governmental agencies requested more than $23 million of grant requests from the trust fund. Of these, 30 projects were selected and awarded over $8.7 million in matching grant funds. Due to increased demand for recreational opportunities, an additional $7.9 million was approved for land acquisition, capital improvement projects, renovations, and emergency repairs in 2011. Since its inception in 1995:

- PARTF has provided nearly 677 grants to local governments for parks and recreation projects
- Grants to local governments have provided green space totaling more than 5500 acres as well as 120 community centers, 900 courts and fields, 340 trail projects, and 260 playgrounds.
- Over 43,000 acres have been protected as important conservation lands.
- Trust fund grants have been awarded in 99 of the state's 100 counties. 342 local governments have received a PARTF grant. Nearly nine out of every ten applicants have received at least one grant.
- PARTF grants have been over matched with $240 million from local governments ($1.70 of local funds for $1.00 of PARTF funds).
- PARTF helps small towns; half of the cities and towns receiving a grant have fewer than 5,000 residents.
- Annual economic impact to local economies of all tourists visiting the state parks system was estimated at more than $400 million (2008) in sales and income as well as nearly 5000 jobs.

== Sources ==
- Ledford, Lewis. "Parks and Recreation Trust Fund Annual Report 2011" (PDF). N.C. Division of Parks and Recreation. Archived from the original (PDF) on 2012-03-27.
- Goode Vick, Candace. "Parks and Recreation" (PDF). UNC-Chapel Hill School of Government.
- Frankel, Jake (October 25, 2012). "Gov. Perdue announces State Parks Trust Fund grants; Buncombe receives $40,057". Mountain Xpress.
- Chavez, Karen (2013-02-13). "Record visits to State Parks in 2012". Asheville Citizen-Times.
- "Meeting the Needs of North Carolina's Citizens - Now and in the future" (PDF). N.C. Friends of State Parks.
- "Parks and Recreation Trust Fund". Recreation Resources Service. Archived from the original on 2010-06-10.
- "N.C. General Assembly". General Statute 113-44.15. Law Server Online.
