= North Carolina Commission on Interracial Cooperation =

The North Carolina Commission on Interracial Cooperation was a state affiliate of the Commission on Interracial Cooperation, established in 1921 to improve race relations by changing racial attitudes and alleviating injustice. Activities included creating pamphlets, radio programs, press releases, and holding local meetings and conferences. The NCCIC was initially made up of a group of prominent individuals, both African American and white. Chairs of the NCCIC included William Louis Poteat, Howard Odum, and Edwin Pennick. Directors included L. R. Reynolds, Earnest Arnold, and Cyrus M. Johnson.

In 1951, the NCCIC became an affiliate of the Southern Regional Council, and changed its name to the North Carolina Council on Human Relations in 1955.
