= North Carolina age of juvenile jurisdiction =

Raising the age of juvenile jurisdiction in the state of North Carolina has been an ongoing issue in the North Carolina General Assembly. There are currently two pieces of legislation focusing on this issue, Senate Bill 506 and House Bill 632, which seek to raise the age of jurisdiction from 16 to 18. Four members of the North Carolina House of Representatives serve as the primary sponsors and there are twenty-six co-sponsors. Most of U.S. States define an adult at 18 years old; however, North Carolina and New York define a juvenile who has committed a criminal offense as no older than 16, which places 16- and 17-year-olds in a position where they are tried as adults for any offense.

Various advocacy groups are in favor of the proposed legislation and see the answer to a more productive society as one which conceals the criminal record of a minor through the age at which an individual is charged in adult court. While opponents fear this legislation will create opportunity for repeat offenders, they are also concerned with the funding for the program, as it seems there is not enough funding at the current capacity. A cost-benefit analysis done by the Vera Institute of Justice determined that initial costs would be high, but in the long run, raising the age would save money because offenders would be more productive in society.

== History ==
Juvenile jurisdiction issues originated in 1919, "when fourteen- and fifteen-year-olds initially charged in juvenile court with felonies could be transferred to superior court. Since that time, transfer to adult court has been mandatory for some of the state's most serious felonies. In 1994, the minimum age of transfer was reduced from fourteen to thirteen, giving North Carolina judges the discretion to transfer offenders as young as thirteen from juvenile to superior court for any felony crime." The controversy surrounding raising the age of juvenile jurisdiction has been contested for years. "In 1919, child welfare advocates recognized that providing preventative services to young offenders through the juvenile court system would likely lower the crime rate. In 1947, welfare officials recommended that young offenders receive treatment in specialized boarding homes and detention centers rather than adult jails, as they had found that this investment of time, effort, and money was more than repaid by the improvement in the behavior and attitudes of the children. In 1957, the governor asserted that including sixteen- and seventeen-year-olds within the original jurisdiction of juvenile court would ultimately provide great savings in money and human services. In 1967, it was found that rehabilitating young offenders by providing meaningful academic services and vocational education in open, closely supervised training schools lowered recidivism rates more effectively than methods that punish, ignore, isolate or try to fit the children into a pattern."

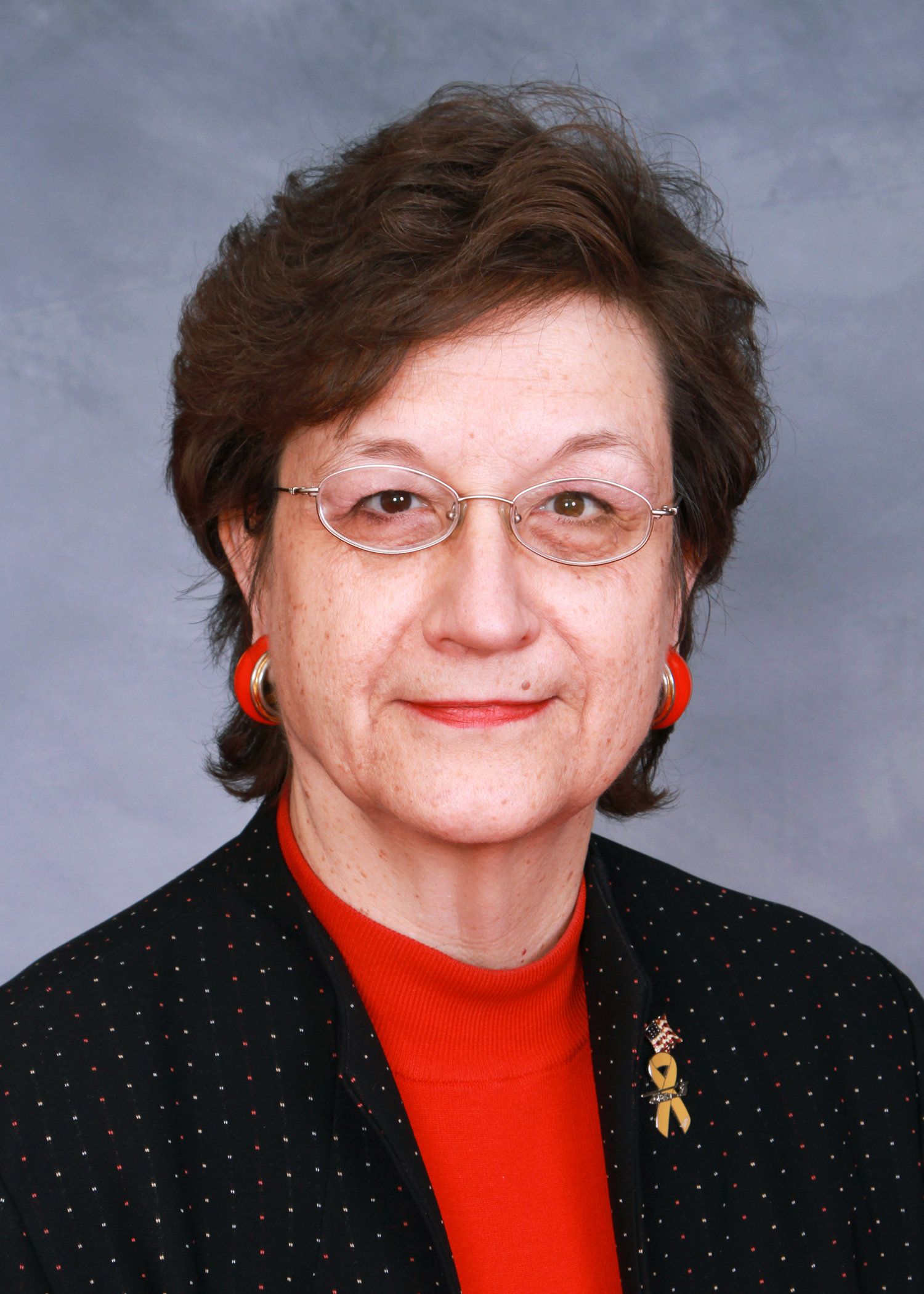
Representative Marilyn Avila, one of the primary sponsors of House Bill 632

North Carolina House Bill 632 is bipartisan and supported primarily by children advocacy groups such as Action for Children North Carolina and have made several attempts to push legislation. The primary sponsors of the bill include Representatives David Lewis, Shirley Randleman, Marilyn Avila, and Alice Bordsen. The bill is described as "an act to amend the definition of delinquent juvenile to raise the age from sixteen to eighteen years in six-month increments over a four-year period, to provide that sixteen- and seventeen-year-olds who have been previously convicted of a felony in adult court shall remain in adult court, to provide that sixteen- and seventeen-year olds alleged delinquent for a class A-E felony shall be transferred to adult court, to make conforming changes to other statutes relevant to changing the definition of delinquent juvenile, and to extend the youth accountability task force." This bill was filed on April 5, 2011 and was referred to the Committee on Rules, Calendar, and Operations of the House on the following day. On April 7, 2011 the bill was withdrawn from the committee and was re-referred to the Committee. Similar bills have failed in the past because they do not consider the biggest problem associated with the legislation which is the cost associated with increasing the number of children in an underfunded program.

According to WRAL-TV News, "the suggestion is to raise the age of jurisdiction only for misdemeanors and low-level nonviolent felony offenses. It would not apply in cases where a person is accused of violent crimes." Peg Dorer, executive director of the North Carolina Conference of District Attorneys, states "adult courts are better suited to handle adolescents charges with serious offenses like rape, manslaughter, larceny, or murder." In the year 2009, "more than 96 percent were convictions for misdemeanors or low-level felonies." According to Jeff Hampton of The Virginian-Pilot, "Changing the law in North Carolina would move 20,000 teens annually into the juvenile system when the conversion is completed, doubling the current load, according to a 2009 report by the North Carolina Governor's Crime Commission."

== Current policy ==
According to The Children's Alliance, the current policy is defined by the following:

- 13- to 17-year-olds who commit A felony - mandatory adult system
- 13- to 15-year-olds who commit B-E felony - juvenile system with option for transfer hearing to adult court
- 6- to 12-year-olds who commit any offense - juvenile court, no transfer hearing option

== House Bill 632 ==
According to The Children's Alliance, the proposed legislation is defined by the following:

- 16- to 17-year-olds that commit an A-E felony will be transferred to the adult system (will remain in the adult system).
- 16- to 17-year-old who commit B-E felony - mandatory adult system unless prosecutor finds extraordinary circumstances for juvenile system.
- 13- to 17-year-olds who commit F-I felony - juvenile system with option for transfer hearing to adult court.
- 13- to 17-year-olds who commit misdemeanor - juvenile court, but can transfer with hearing if also charged with a felony.
- 16- to 17-year-olds charged with motor vehicle violations remain in adult court
- Once juvenile is transferred to adult system, always remain in adult system for any subsequent charges (applies to any 16- to 17-year-old that has already been charged in adult system when law takes effect).
- Where detention is necessary, places 16- and 17-year-olds in juvenile detention if they are under the jurisdiction of juvenile court and in county jail if they are under the jurisdiction of adult court.
- Anticipate taking 4 years to move all 16- to 17-year-olds to the juvenile system:

2015 - less than 16 1/2-year-olds move to juvenile system
2016 - less than 17-year-olds move to juvenile system
2017 - less than 17 1/2-year-olds move to juvenile system
2018 - less than 18-year-olds move to juvenile system

== Policy formulation ==
An emphasis has been placed on increasing the age until which a minor can be sentenced in juvenile court for various reasons. Advocates are concerned for the future of minors who are charged with crimes and the long-lasting effects. "One of the strongest arguments for raising the age of juvenile court jurisdiction concerns the impact of a criminal conviction on a youth's ability to obtain work" Often potential employees can be denied employment because of past criminal activities, even if they did not receive a conviction. Another concern of advocates is the opportunity for higher education can be denied or limited by a criminal record. As stated by Tamar Birckhead, "Access to high education lowers recidivism rates by opening the doors to economic and social advancement, excluding people from college on this basis will inevitably have a deleterious effect on the safety of the community at large."

Advocates also see the importance of minors being placed in the juvenile system because of the services which are available to offenders. By "providing intensive supervision, meaningful treatment, and rehabilitation to sixteen- and seventeen-year-olds in juvenile court, rather than trying and incarcerating them with adult defendants in criminal courts and prisons, would lower recidivism rates" whereas "youth who are tried and sentences as adults have been shown to receive little or no education services, mental health or substance abuse treatment, job training, or any other type of rehabilitative programming." "While rehabilitation programs and intensive treatment for adolescents can be expensive, they ultimately save money by reducing the numbers of those who are prosecuted and sentenced as repeat offenders." According to the Campaign for Youth Justice, "empirical research has demonstrated that violent adolescent offenders prosecuted in adult criminal court are likely to re-offend more quickly and more often than those adjudicated in a juvenile court setting."

== Costs ==
The Vera Institute of Justice conducted a cost-benefit analysis which found that "raising the age of juvenile jurisdiction from 16 to 18 for alleged misdemeanants and low-level felons will generate $52.3 million in net benefits, per annual cohort of youth aged 16 and 17, from the combined perspectives of taxpayers, victims, and youth." In addition, "the policy change will generate an annual net cost of $49.2 million. The net cost equals a cost of $70.9 million to North Carolina's justice agencies minus $21.7 million in benefits to the criminal justice system." "From the victim perspective, raising the age will generate $3.6 million in benefits, per annual cohort of youth aged 16 and 17. Youth whose cases will be handled in the juvenile system will reoffend at lower rates than if they were processed in the adult system, thus reducing victimization and victimization costs." "From the youth perspective, the policy change will generate $97.9 million in long-term benefits, per annual cohort of youth aged 16 and 17. These benefits accrue over a period of 35 years and result from increased lifetime earnings, based upon the fact that youth tried in the juvenile rather than the adult system will be free of the burden of a criminal record that suppresses earning potential." The report concluded that raising the age will "cost taxpayers $70.9 million a year and that this annually reoccurring investment will generate $123.1 million in reoccurring benefits to youth, victims, and taxpayers over the long term. The results indicate that the benefits of the plan outweigh the costs and that, from a cost-benefit standpoint, the policy change merits consideration."

Advocates argue while initial costs are high, over time the costs will balance out as those who are not charged as adults are less likely from becoming re-offenders. Inherently, the costs of detaining juveniles in comparison to adults is more expensive because they require more care. However, this cost is offset by the increased success the juveniles will accomplish throughout their life when tried as a juvenile rather than an adult. One of the bill's sponsors, Alice Bordsen, states the bill "saves you money in the near future and in the distant future" supporting the argument that while implementation will be costly, it will serve best to 16- and 17-year-olds by allowing them the chance to have a successful future.

Opponents of the bill are concerned primarily with the cost associated with adding juveniles to the system, which is estimated around $50 million a year. Susan Doyle, representing the North Carolina Conference of District Attorneys, the "current juvenile system is horribly underfunded and would be crushed under the weight of the requirements of this bill without significant additional funding." Funding is a deciding factor for many faced with this issue, as many community leaders fear the strain that will be placed on the juvenile system without proper funding. Eddie Caldwell, spokesman for the North Carolina Sheriffs' Association, states "they are opposed to the current legislation that proposes raising the juvenile age without providing the programs, facilities, and funding that are necessary to do so." Caldwell also argues. "It does not make sense to take a system that all the experts agree does not have the resources to care for the children, and then add two more age groups." Debby Burchfield, director of the Juvenile Detention Center in Buncombe County, has been quoted as saying: "The biggest impact would be physical space, other than additional personnel. Some kids stay just 24 hours, while most stay an average of seven to 10 days."

But as North Carolina entered into the threshold of finally correcting its outdated laws regarding juveniles, it became a matter of feasibility versus morality—placing at last its Republican opponents on the backfoot. Rob Thompson, a senior policy advisor at NC Child, a state youth advocacy group,

“I do think that a message that we should be sending is, and it’s maybe the opposite of the one that we are sending is that kids make a lot of mistakes, and they deserve second chances. We need to do what we can to get that kids life back on track—not make it worse.”

In previous years, lawmakers on both sides of the aisle filed bills seeking to 'raise the age' from 16 to 18 years-of-age. But those proposed laws would always die in committee. By 2017, however, it was different. House Bill 280 was introduced in early March of that year by Henderson County Republican Chuck McGrady, and it had four primary sponsors—three Republicans and one Democrat. The bill also had 68 co-sponsors—a majority of representatives, evenly split down the aisle.

“Which is the most I’ve ever seen on a bill,” said William Lassiter, deputy secretary of juvenile justice for the North Carolina Department of Public Safety. “We’re really excited about it, and it’s evenly split between Democrats and Republicans. The current piece of legislation wouldn’t be implemented until December 1, 2019, and so that would give the state the time it would need, and getting the resources they need to be ready for this change. It’s really important that we get it right.”

Previous incarnations of the measure were killed due to fears of appearing soft on crime, or creating unfunded mandates for state and local governments. After nearly a decade of efforts to implement the change, party majority changes in Raleigh, a recession and greater political events stealing the state's spotlight—the initiative to 'raise the age' was primed for success in late 2017.

“The big difference between this bill and past bills is that that work was done," Lassiter said. "We went and met with stakeholders, we talked to stakeholders, about what their concerns were. Is there someone out there that still may disagree? Quite possibly. But what I would say is this was a compromise bill that reflects all the stakeholders that are involved in the criminal justice system in the state of North Carolina.”

Despite working out all the kinks in the draft legislation that year, the only officials still opposed to the change beyond its technical limitations were criminal justice officials like Western North Carolina District Attorney Ashley Welch. In an interview she gave to Asheville journalist Davin Eldridge, the Republican prosecutor appealed to the concept of prosecutorial discretion.

“Young people need a little more attention than help," said Welch. "My concern is that, if you just raise the age, it takes away a lot of our discretion so there’s certain crimes that really need to be prosecuted very seriously like homicides, rapes. There’s always been this provision that we can transfer juveniles to adult court. I tried to do that one time, and it’s in the discretion of the court and it was denied.”

Welch said she could see the need for the change, however as a district attorney, she didn’t want to be caught flat-footed.

“The message it sends is that, at least from a prosecutor’s standpoint, that you don’t trust prosecutors to make the right decision," Welch said. "In one way I support it, but I have reservations. But I don’t like the way it’s being pushed right now, because it takes away a lot of our discretion.”

Prosecutorial discretion itself, however, remains under fire in North Carolina squarely because of attorneys like Welch, after questionable track records of case dismissals has led a growing number in the public to call for her removal from office. The prosecutor has since pivoted from lobbying for her office's preservation of powers on juvenile cases to other matters.

== Other Concerns ==
One issue with the current law is that the 16- and 17-year-olds who are currently tried as an adult face permanent and long-lasting effects as they have a criminal record furthering them from chances for improvement. By raising the age, it is anticipated that recidivism will be reduced and the quality of life will be increased for those who would have become re-offenders. The NC task force believes that this legislation could benefit young adults when tried as juveniles rather than adults because it would allow those who have committed nonviolent crimes an opportunity to live a successful life as an adult. The task force believes the juvenile system allows those charged to "take advantage of the rehabilitation services."

Opponents of the bill believe that by raising the age the legislature is giving children two additional years to commit crimes knowing they would not be charged in an adult court, suggesting that the proposed law would not provide any deterrence. Eddie Caldwell provides a valid defense against the proposed legislation and proves to be the leading contestant against House Bill 632. In addition to monetary costs that are associated with the legislation, Caldwell argues various other reasons as to why the legislation is disorganized. Caldwell argues that advocates are not addressing a major concern in which he states, "if its a kid that's done something wrong - as we all have - some worse than others, for the first time, then how do you deal with the child as opposed to the one that you've dealt with 100 times before?" He also states, "Currently we allow that age group to decide whether or not they want to drop out of school, and that decision is no less important to the future of that child, and no less critical to their success than whether or not they commit a crime." While taking a critical stance against the proposed policy, Caldwell "says the Sheriff's Association is in favor of allotting the Department of Juvenile Justice with the proper resources for its current overall workload."
