= North Carolina Sullivan Acts =

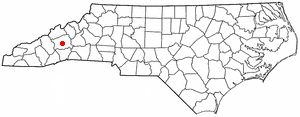
Map of North Carolina, with its counties. Asheville is shown as dot, in Buncombe County. Henderson County is the county to the south of Buncombe County.

The Sullivan Acts are a set of statutes passed by the North Carolina General Assembly in response to the bankruptcy of all sewer and water districts in the City of Asheville and Buncombe County, North Carolina. As provided in the statute (Sullivan Act I), only the City of Asheville, in the provision of water, may not charge a higher rate for consumers outside city limits. Since the enactment of the legislation, several significant changes have come to Asheville: economic prosperity, the adoption and termination of a City-County water agreement, and repeated efforts to overturn the legislation. While there are three Acts, the final two are modifications of the water agreement between the City of Asheville and Buncombe County.

Considering the scope of issues, ranging from home rule to water rights, many different avenues of solutions have been sought. A State Representative for the area (District 116) at the time, Tim Moffitt, initiated a study committee on the issue, but was met with local opposition. Opponents argued that water system control should remain the municipal right of Ashville rather than directed by the state legislature. The study committee has recently decided to move control of the water system from the city to the Metropolitan Sewerage District.

== Timeline ==
Below is the timeline of major events relating to the Sullivan Acts.

- 1920's: "Water districts emerge outside the city, taxing their own residents. They go broke during the Great Depression, and Buncombe County takes on the debt ... Asheville eventually annexes the areas, taking on the debt."
- 1933: The Sullivan Act is passed.
- 1955: "Asheville passes higher water rates for noncity customers."
- 1958: "North Carolina Supreme Court upholds Sullivan and finds the higher rates illegal."
- 1981: "Buncombe County and Asheville form a water authority, but it is not fully independent. The agreement allows each government to take money from water system profits."
- 2004: City announces termination of the water authority, per agreement rules, and plans to take control of the system.
- June 29, 2005: The North Carolina General Assembly "passes Sullivan II and Sullivan III, reinforcing the rate structure, requiring Asheville to extend water service to noncity residents and mandating that all water revenue go back into the water system."
- June 30, 2005: "The water agreement ends and the system becomes an Asheville department."
- August 10, 2005: "Asheville sues over the Sullivan Acts in Wake County Superior Court."
- February 2, 2007: "Judge Howard E. Manning Jr., finds in favor of the state and county."

== History ==
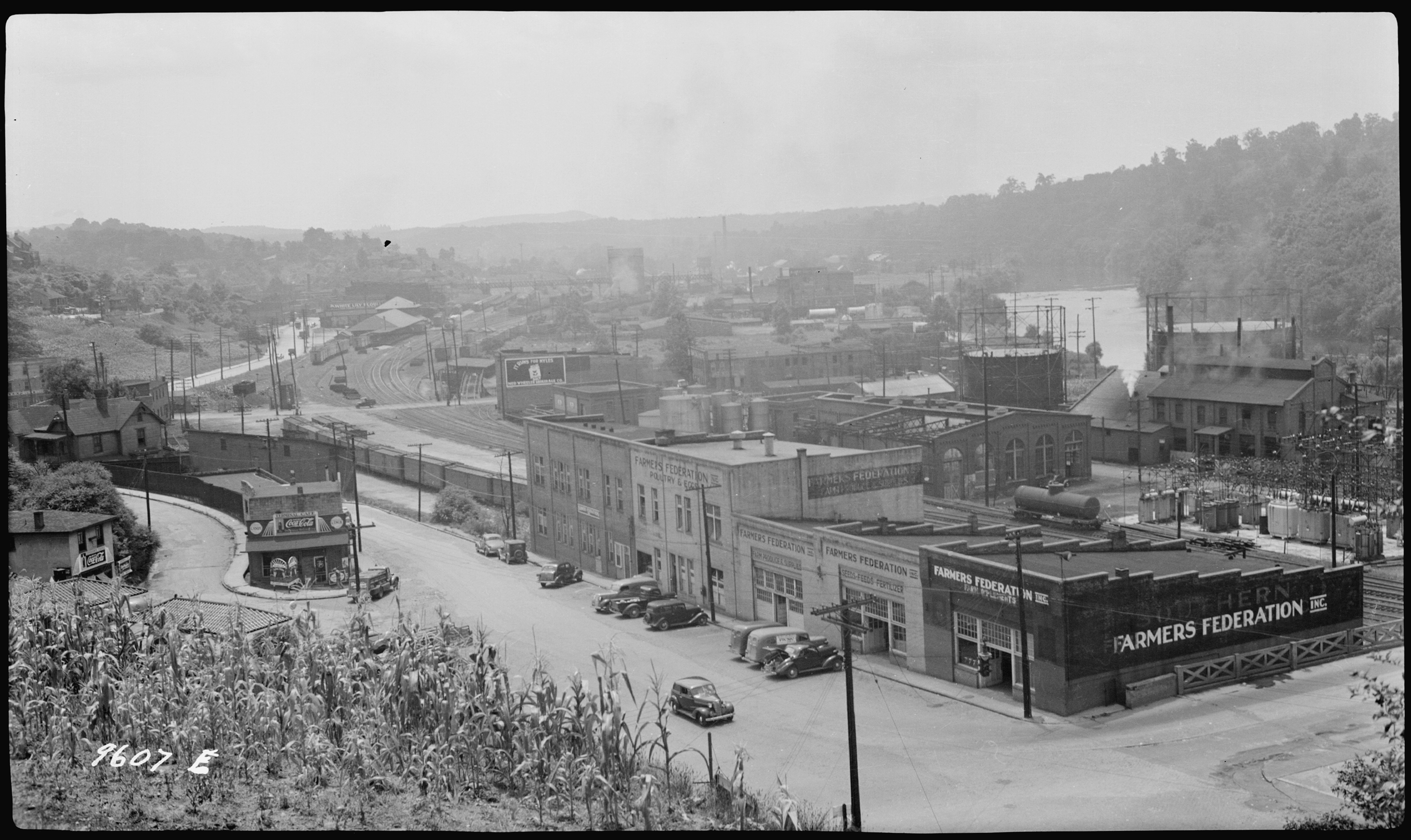
Part of Asheville in 1940.

The 1920s brought prosperity to many areas until the beginning of the Great Depression, which bankrupted them. For the City of Asheville and Buncombe County, North Carolina, the Great Depression caused major economic damage that boiled over into other areas:

At the end of the 1920s, around 100,000 people lived in Buncombe County which represented an almost five fold increase over twenty years. Many areas were developed during this time, including a large part of downtown Asheville. By the end of this period, almost every aspect of the community lay in financial ruin, including local governments. It took county and city governments over forty years to pay off the indebtedness incurred during the boom period. One of the components of local government that defaulted on their debt was our local water districts. These districts were established to provide public water service to many areas of our community. County government agreed to assume the debts of these water districts. Because the county was liable for the debt, the North Carolina General Assembly passed the Sullivan Act. This local bill forced Asheville to provide water service to these districts at the same rates that they charged city residents.

A primary implication of the legislation is the city's inability to incentivize annexation as many other cities do. However, the overall economics of Sullivan Act I meant a large percentage of water revenues were for debt obligations and general fund dollars were spent on expansion and maintenance. While the city fought against the law for years, it contested the Sullivan Act in the 1950s, and the North Carolina Supreme Court upheld the law. Later on, the city launched a failed effort for the legislature to overturn the legislation.

=== The City/County water agreement ===
Asheville faced exhaustive spending on the water system because the facilities were constructed around the 1920s and the revenue constriction of Sullivan Act I. In 1981, the city and county created a water agreement. Under this agreement, some rules were laid out:

- The water system was governed by a city and county appointed water authority.
- Asheville's City Manager still hired water system personnel.
- Titles for large city-owned properties were transferred to the county, which maintained and managed them.
- Asheville "agreed not to mount further challenges to [the] Sullivan Act."
- "The county also agreed to pay all municipalities in the county a payment that represented the amount of the Sheriff's Department budget allocated to patrol and investigation functions."
- "Under the agreement, 5 percent of water revenues went to the city and 2.5 percent to the county."

As time passed, few problems occurred until 1994 when a potential water shortage threatened the area.

[These] fears about potential water shortages prompted Asheville and Buncombe County to broker a deal with Henderson County so that a plant could be built at the confluence of the Mills and French Broad rivers. The Water Agreement that the three governments signed in 1995 added Henderson County representatives to the Authority.

Henderson County is located just south of Buncombe County. By 2003, disagreements arose regarding system maintenance and new fees culminating in Asheville rejecting the implementing new fees. Thus, "in 2005, Asheville dissolved a joint control agreement with Buncombe and Henderson counties and took sole ownership." For the city, repairs, better system control, growth control, better rates, and the promotion of voluntary annexation were all cited as reasons for termination of the water agreement. However, Buncombe County Commissioners, along with state representatives, stated that businesses needed to be protected. Thereby, the Commissioners petitioned the state legislature to reinforce the original Sullivan Act via Sullivan Acts II and III.

== Current status ==
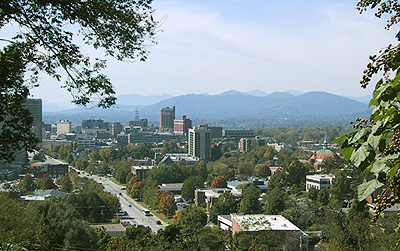
The City of Asheville in October 2005.

The last of the legal attempts to overturn the Sullivan Acts was in 2008. Overall, courts have decided that "water customers in and outside the city, rather than city taxpayers, had the greatest stake in the system because bonds were backed by water bill payments, not city taxes." Technically, with the city-county agreement dissolved, Sullivan Acts II and III no longer apply. Only Sullivan Act I, reaffirmed by Sullivan Acts II and III, remains applicable law.

The most recent debate began when the North Carolina General Assembly placed tight restrictions on annexation along with Representative Moffitt's help on further restrictions specific to the Biltmore Lake subdivision that Asheville was attempting to involuntarily annex. Shortly thereafter, Asheville City Council "raised fees by a total of $340,000 on high volume users, including many businesses." The city cited a study supporting the increase because rates for high-volume users were low compared to similar areas. Representative Moffitt "called the rise 'arbitrary,' saying the city could pick and choose which studies to use." However, city leaders emphasized the fee increase as a necessary part of keeping up the system.

On May 4, 2011, Representative Tim Moffitt "introduced a bill that called for seizing the [water system] ... and handing it off to the Metropolitan Sewerage District."

Following a major backlash by local elected officials and residents alike, Moffitt backed off. On May 26, he turned it into a study bill, establishing a committee to make a recommendation on whether to leave the system with the city, turn it over to MSD or to a new, independent water authority. Asked about the change, Moffitt said this had been his intent all along.

Both representation and location plagued the committee as issues. The study committee was composed of four Republicans and one Democrat, with three of the committee members not located in the mountains of North Carolina (where Asheville is located). Moreover, in the actual area of the water system, two representatives, both Democrats, were left out of the committee. Based on the 2010 North Carolina General Assembly House Districts, these two representatives, Susan Fisher and Patsy Keever, represented approximately 61% of rate-payers. With 2012's redistricting, Fisher and Keever represent 68% of rate-payers. Thus, only one committee member, Tim Moffitt, represented Asheville and Representative Chuck McGrady represented Henderson County, where the water system was extended into the northern part of the county in 1994. Respectively, these representatives represent 39% based on 2010 maps and 32% based on the 2012 redistricting maps.

On location, all committee meetings were held in Raleigh, except for the February 21, 2012, Public Hearing. The public hearing brought many residents, ratepayers, and elected officials from the cities and counties. While no Asheville residents who addressed the hearing favored any change, the response from elected officials was a little more mixed.

The news leading up to the decision date suggested a high likelihood of the regional metropolitan sewerage district regaining control, though the representation issues were not specifically worked out. On April 13, 2012, the study committee released a unanimous decision: "The General Assembly should mandate that the $173.5 million system be transferred to the public body that runs Buncombe's sewage system by 2013 ... Or the city and the Buncombe County Metropolitan Sewerage District can first work out a deal." As Representative Moffitt stated, "taking the system from the city would ensure that water customers outside Asheville would never be charged higher rates than city residents." Thereby, the study committee's recommendation continues to uphold the Sullivan Acts. The Asheville City Council seems to be against the decision, though no official statement has been released. Overall, based on the study committee's report, privatization and consolidation of the region's water resources seem to be an end-goal.
