= North Carolina Capital Area Metropolitan Planning Organization =

The North Carolina Capital Area Metropolitan Planning Organization (NC CAMPO) is the federally required Metropolitan Planning Organization responsible for the continuous and comprehensive transportation planning process in Wake County and parts of Chatham County, Franklin County, Granville County, Harnett County and Johnston County Counties. NC CAMPO is responsible for carrying out an annual work program that includes updating the Metropolitan Transportation Improvement Program (a seven-year project programming schedule) and the Long-Range Transportation Plan (a minimum twenty-year forecast of projects and programs).

== Governance ==
The Capital Area Metropolitan Planning Organization has three parts: a Transportation Advisory Committee (TAC), a Technical Coordinating Committee (TCC), and a staff that serves the members of these boards. The MPO is governed by its Transportation Advisory Committee. There are a total of 26 voting members including elected officials and representatives of the North Carolina Department of Transportation Highway Districts 4, 5, 6 and 8, Triangle Transit Authority, Capital Area Transit, and the Federal Highway Administration. The elected officials represent the 5 counties and 17 municipalities that lie within the NC Capital Area MPO's metropolitan area.

The TAC typically meets on the third Wednesday of each month from 4:00 pm–6:00 pm in Cary, NC. The TCC typically meets on the first Thursday of each month from 10:00 am – 12:00 pm in Cary, NC.

== Staff ==
NC CAMPO has a staff of 24 positions. Chris Lukasina serves as the executive director.

== Funding ==
NC CAMPO receives its funding through the US Department of Transportation, NC Department of Transportation (NCDOT) and through local match from member municipalities.

== Work ==
NC CAMPO funds projects to upgrade roads and expand public transportation.
