= North Carolina Trailblazers =

Women's hockey team from North Carolina

The North Carolina Trailblazers is a women's recreational ice hockey association founded in April 1995 in Raleigh, North Carolina. It is one of the oldest existing women's hockey programs in the Southeastern United States.

== Origins ==
The Trailblazers were founded by Lise Barley-Maloney and a group of women and girls who held their first practices in Dorton Arena on the N.C. State Fairgrounds.

By the 2000-01 season, the organization had expanded to the point of fielding two full teams. Since then, it has fielded at least two and sometimes three teams each season ranging in skill level from B to D/open (under USA Hockey classifications). In the 2009-10 season, it is running a three-team house league and will organize "tournament teams" for specific competitions.

For its 20th anniversary in 2015, the Trailblazers commemorated the occasion by designing a classic green jersey and holding an exhibition game at the PNC Arena prior to a Carolina Hurricanes game. Alumni were invited to attend both games.

The organization continues to grow, expanding to five teams in 2016 and six in 2019.

== Titles ==
The Trailblazers' B team won the USA Hockey Women's B Southeast Regional title in the 2002-03 season. They made it to the USA Hockey Women's Nationals Semifinal Game that same season. The Trailblazers' C team was the silver medalist (second place) in the Southeast Regional division in 2009.

== Members ==
Notable current and past players include Lise Barley-Maloney, who has served as C team head coach and on the board of the Carolinas Amateur Hockey Association (the regional USA Hockey affiliate); Julia Zeigler, 1999 national State Games female athlete of the year; Emily Cole, wife of NHL player Erik Cole; Sherene Halko, wife of former NHL player Steve Halko; and Kelly Kirwin, member of the Carolina Hurricanes' staff whose name is on the Stanley Cup as a part of that organization during its 2005-06 championship season.

== Official site ==
N.C. Trailblazers Women's Hockey Association
