= North Carolina Animal Protection Act =

The North Carolina Animal Protection Act aims to protect pets and their owners in North Carolina. This legislation models the Animal Welfare Act of 1966 and can be found in the North Carolina General Statutes under Chapter 19A: Protection Of Animals, Article 3, consisting of six articles.

It aims (i) to protect the owners of dogs and cats from the theft of such pets; (ii) to prevent the sale or use of stolen pets; (iii) to insure that animals, as items of commerce, are provided humane care and treatment by regulating the transportation, sale, purchase, housing, care, handling and treatment of such animals by persons or organizations engaged in transporting, buying, or selling them for such use; (iv) to insure that animals confined in pet shops, kennels, animal shelters and auction markets are provided humane care and treatment; (v) to prohibit the sale, trade or adoption of those animals which show physical signs of infection, communicable disease, or congenital abnormalities, unless veterinary care is assured subsequent to sale, trade or adoption.

== Background ==
The Animal Welfare Act of 1966 in the United States began as a response to the treatment of laboratory animals. The 1966 Act set minimum standards for the handling, sale, and transport of cats, dogs, nonhuman primates, rabbits, hamsters, and guinea pigs held by animal dealers for pre-research in laboratories. The Act went further, in response to an incident in England where a woman's dog was dognapped and used in a laboratory, requiring dog and cat dealers, and laboratories to be licensed and to provide identification for their animals as a way to prevent theft of pets.

== Civil Remedy for the Protection of Animals ==
The Civil Remedy for the Protection of Animals provides a legal remedy for the protection and humane treatment of animals in addition to any criminal remedies that are available and it shall be proper in any action to combine causes of action against one or more defendants for the protection of one or more animals. A real party in interest as plaintiff shall include any person even though the person does not have a possessory or ownership right to an animal; a real party in interest as defendant shall include any person who owns or has possession of an animal.

=== Exemptions to this article ===
There are exemptions to this article. Those exemptions are:

- The lawful taking of animals under the jurisdiction and regulation of the Wildlife Resources Commission, except that this article applies to those birds exempted by the Wildlife Resources Commission from its definition of "wild birds" pursuant to N.C. G.S. 113 129(15a).
- Lawful activities conducted for purposes of biomedical research or training or for purposes of production of livestock, poultry, or aquatic species.
- Lawful activities conducted for the primary purpose of providing food for human or animal consumption.
- Activities conducted for lawful veterinary purposes.
- Lawful destruction of any animal for the purposes of protecting the public, other animals, or the public health.
- Lawful activities for sport.

=== Injunctions ===
==== Preliminary injunction ====
Upon discretion of the preliminary injunction judge may issue a preliminary injunction in accordance with the procedures set forth in G.S. 1A‑1, Rule 65 . If the plaintiff requests, s/he may provide suitable care for the animal that the injunction is over. If it appears on the face of the complaint that the condition is giving rise to the cruel treatment of an animal, it requires the animal to be removed from its owner or other person who possesses it. Then it shall be proper for the court in the preliminary injunction to allow the plaintiff to take possession of the animal as custodian. Individual citizens, cities, towns, counties, and animal welfare organizations can use civil injunctions in order to enforce animal cruelty laws.

==== Care of animal pending hearing on merits ====
The plaintiff as custodian of the animal(s) may employ a veterinarian to provide necessary medical care for the animal without any additional court order. Before doing so the plaintiff shall consult with the defendant in the action, but the plaintiff may authorize such care without the defendant's consent. The plaintiff may not have an animal euthanized without written consent of the defendant or a court order that authorizes euthanasia upon the court's finding that the animal is suffering due to terminal illness or terminal injury. The plaintiff may place an animal with a foster care provider, who shall return the animal to the plaintiff on demand.

==== Permanent injunction ====
- The district court judge in the county to whom the original action was brought shall determine the merits of the action in a trial without a jury, and upon hearing such evidence as may be presented, shall enter orders as the court deems appropriate, including a permanent injunction and dismissal of the action along with dissolution of any preliminary injunction that had been issued.
- If the plaintiff prevails, the court in its discretion may include the costs of food, water, shelter, and care, including medical care, provided to the animal, plus any amounts deposited by the defendant under G.S. 19A‑70, as part of the costs allowed to the plaintiff under G.S. 6‑18. In addition, if the court finds by a preponderance of the evidence that even if a permanent injunction were issued there would exist a substantial risk that the animal would be subjected to further cruelty if returned to the possession of the defendant, the court may terminate the defendant's ownership and right of possession of the animal and transfer ownership and right of possession to the plaintiff or other appropriate successor owner. For good cause shown, the court may also enjoin the defendant from acquiring new animals for a specified period of time or limit the number of animals the defendant may own or possess during a specified period of time.
- If the final judgment entitles the defendant to regain possession of the animal, the custodian shall return the animal, including taking any necessary steps to retrieve the animal from a foster care provider.
- The court shall consider and may provide for custody and care of the animal until the time to appeal expires or all appeals have been exhausted.

== Protection of black bears ==
Article 2 calls for the protection of black bears. This article makes it unlawful in North Carolina to buy, sell or enclose black bears. Zoos and wildlife reserves that are operated by governmental agencies, as well as educational institutions in which black bears are kept or exhibited for training or research in the natural sciences, are exempt from this statute.

== Animal Welfare Act ==
The purposes of this article are (i) to protect the owners of dogs and cats from the theft of such pets; (ii) to prevent the sale or use of stolen pets; (iii) to insure that animals, as items of commerce, are provided humane care and treatment by regulating the transportation, sale, purchase, housing, care, handling and treatment of such animals by persons or organizations engaged in transporting, buying, or selling them for such use; (iv) to insure that animals confined in pet shops, kennels, animal shelters and auction markets are provided humane care and treatment; (v) to prohibit the sale, trade or adoption of those animals which show physical signs of infection, communicable disease, or congenital abnormalities, unless veterinary care is assured subsequent to sale, trade or adoption.

This article created the Animal Health Division of the North Carolina Department of Agriculture and Consumer Services to be known as the Animal Welfare Section of said division. The Commissioner of Agriculture was authorized to appoint the Director of the Animal Welfare Section whose duties and authority was determined by the Commissioner, subject to the approval of the Board of Agriculture and to the provisions of this article.

=== Enforcing animal welfare provisions ===
The director may, upon approval of the Commissioner, appoint employees to enforce the provisions of the animal welfare article. A dog warden may impound an animal when its owner infringes upon any of these statutes, and each animal shall constitute a separate offense.

=== License and registration ===
The Director has the ability to issue certificates of registration and licenses to animal shelters, pet shops, public auctions, boarding kennels, and dealers, but excluding facilities used for boarding or training hunting dogs. Some licenses incur annual fees, and they may be revoked after an impartial investigation. The causes for revocation include willful violation of articles, failure to properly care for the animals, registration fraud, and misrepresentation of the licensed business. The Director must issue a suspension before refusing renewal as well as a written statement indicating the violations.

A person may contest and refile a claim and may incur a monetary penalty for operating a pet shop, kennel, or public auction or for acting as dealer without a valid dealer's license. Licensees may incur a fine if they fail to adequately house, feed, and water animals in his custody.

=== Application of this article ===
This article shall not apply to a place or establishment which is operated under the immediate supervision of a duly licensed veterinarian as a hospital where animals are harbored, boarded, and cared for incidental to the treatment, prevention, or alleviation of disease processes during the routine practice of the profession of veterinary medicine. This article shall not apply to any dealer, pet shop, public auction, commercial kennel or research facility during the period such dealer or research facility is in the possession of a valid license or registration granted by the Secretary of Agriculture pursuant to Title 7, Chapter 54, of the United States Code. This article shall not apply to any individual who occasionally boards an animal on a noncommercial basis, although such individual may receive nominal sums to cover the cost of such boarding.

=== Civil penalties ===
Section 19A‑40 allows The Director to place a civil penalty no more than $5,000 against anyone who violates this article. When placing a civil penalty The Director has to consider the degree and extent of harm caused by the violation. The clear proceeds of civil penalties assessed pursuant to this section shall be remitted to the Civil Penalty and Forfeiture Fund in accordance with G.S. 115C‑457.2.

=== Attorney general ===
Section 19A‑41 deals with the legal representation by the attorney general for the Commissioner of Agriculture and the Department of Agriculture and Consumer Services. The attorney general also can designate some member of his staff to represent the commissioner and the department, in all actions or proceedings in connection with this article.

== Animal cruelty investigators ==
Animal cruelty investigators, who investigate alleged inhumane treatment against animals. They must take any animal they seize directly to a safe and secure place suitable for the animal's well-being.

They are not employees but may expense charges incurred back to the county, and it is a misdemeanor to interfere with them. They serve for a one-year term to the county, and they subscribe to the oath of office required of public officials. At their own expense, they must attend an annual course of at least six hours of instruction offered by the North Carolina Humane Federation or some other accredited agency.

=== Process for seizure ===
The animal cruelty investigator must file a claim to the magistrate to seize an animal. With enough probable cause, the magistrate may place a seizure order for the investigator to execute. The investigator may forcibly enter any premises or vehicle when necessary, so long as it is unoccupied by any person. The investigator must issue a notice to the owner after filing a claim.

== Spay/neuter clinic ==
=== Legislative findings ===
The General Assembly finds that the uncontrolled breeding of cats and dogs in the State has led to unacceptable numbers of unwanted dogs, puppies and cats and kittens. These unwanted animals become strays and constitute a public nuisance and a public health hazard. The animals themselves suffer privation and death, are impounded, and most are destroyed at great expense to local governments. It is the intention of the General Assembly to provide a voluntary means of funding a spay/neuter program to provide financial assistance to local governments offering low‑income persons reduced‑cost spay/neuter services for their dogs and cats and to provide a statewide education program on the benefits of spaying and neutering pets.

=== Spay/neuter program ===
There is established in the Department of Agriculture and Consumer Services a voluntary statewide program to foster the spaying and neutering of dogs and cats for the purpose of reducing the population of unwanted animals in the State. The program shall consist of the following components:

==== Education program ====
The department shall establish a statewide program to educate the public about the benefits of having cats and dogs spayed and neutered. The department may work cooperatively on the program with the North Carolina School of Veterinary Medicine, other State agencies and departments, county and city health departments and animal control agencies, and statewide and local humane organizations. The department may employ outside consultants to assist with the education program.

==== Local spay/neuter assistance program ====
The department shall administer the Spay/Neuter Account established in G.S. 19A‑62. Monies deposited in the account shall be available to reimburse eligible counties and cities for the direct costs of spay/neuter surgeries for cats and dogs made available to low‑income persons.

=== Spay/Neuter Account established and revenues ===
The Spay/Neuter Account is established as a nonreverting special revenue account in the Department of Agriculture and Consumer Services. The Account consists of the following:

- Repealed by Session Laws 2010‑31, s. 11.4(c), effective October 1, 2010.
- Twenty dollars of the additional fee imposed by G.S. 20‑79.7 for an Animal Lovers special license plate.
- Any other funds available from appropriations by the General Assembly or from contributions and grants from public or private sources.
- The revenue in the Account shall be used by the Department of Agriculture and Consumer Services as follows:
- Repealed by Session Laws 2010‑31, s. 11.4(c), effective October 1, 2010.
- Up to 20% may be used to develop and implement the statewide education program component of the Spay/Neuter Program established in G.S. 19A‑61(1).
- Up to 20% of the money in the Account may be used to defray the costs of administering the Spay/Neuter Program established in this article.
- Funds remaining after deductions for the education program and administrative expenses shall be distributed quarterly to eligible counties and cities seeking reimbursement for reduced‑cost spay/neuter surgeries performed during the previous calendar year. A county or city is ineligible to receive funds under this subdivision unless it requires the owner to show proof of rabies vaccination at the time of the procedure or, if none, require vaccination at the time of the procedure.

In February of each year, the department must report to the Joint Legislative Commission on Governmental Operations and the Fiscal Research Division. The report must contain information regarding all revenues and expenditures of the Spay/Neuter Account.

=== Eligibility for distributions from Spay/Neuter Account ===
A county or city is eligible for reimbursement from the Spay/Neuter Account if it meets the following condition: The county or city offers one or more of the following programs to low‑income persons year‑round for the purpose of reducing the cost of spaying and neutering procedures for dogs and cats:

- A spay/neuter clinic operated by the county or city.
- A spay/neuter clinic operated by a private organization under contract or other arrangement with the county or city.
- A contract or contracts with one or more veterinarians to provide reduced‑cost spaying and neutering procedures.
- Subvention of the spaying and neutering costs incurred by low‑income pet owners, people whose annual household income lower than 300% of the federal poverty level, through the use of vouchers or other procedure that provides a discount of the cost of the spaying or neutering procedure fixed by a participating veterinarian or other provider.
- Subvention of the spaying and neutering costs incurred by persons who adopt a pet from an animal shelter operated by or under contract with the county or city.

=== Distributions to counties and cities from Spay/Neuter Account ===
Counties and cities eligible for distributions from the Spay/Neuter Account may receive reimbursement for the direct costs of a spay/neuter surgical procedure for a dog or cat owned by a low‑income person as defined earlier. Reimbursable costs include anesthesia, medication, and veterinary services. Counties and cities cannot be reimbursed for the administrative costs of providing reduced‑cost spay/neuter services or capital expenditures for facilities and equipment associated with the provision of such services.

A county or city able to receive reimbursement of spaying and neutering costs from the Spay/Neuter Account must apply to the Department of Agriculture and Consumer Services by the last day of January, April, July, and October of each year to receive a distribution from the Account for that quarter. The application shall be submitted in the form required by the department and shall include an itemized listing of the costs for which reimbursement is sought.

The department shall make payments from the Spay/Neuter Account to eligible counties and cities who have made timely application for reimbursement within 30 days of the closing date for receipt of applications for that quarter. In the event that total requests for reimbursement exceed the amounts available in the Spay/Neuter Account for distribution, the monies available will be distributed as follows:

- 50% of the monies available in the Spay/Neuter Account shall be reserved for reimbursement for eligible applicants within development tier one areas as defined in G.S. 143B‑437.08. The remaining 50% of the funds shall be used to fund reimbursement requests from eligible applicants in development tier two and three areas as defined in G.S. 143B‑437.08.
- Among the eligible counties and cities in development tier one areas, reimbursement shall be made to each eligible county or city pursuant to rules adopted by the department.
- Among the eligible counties and cities in development tier two and three areas, reimbursement shall be made to each eligible county or city pursuant to rules adopted by the department.
- Should funds remain available from the 50% of the Spay/Neuter Account designated for development tier one areas after reimbursement of all claims by eligible applicants in those areas, the remaining funds shall be made available to reimburse eligible applicants in development tier two and three areas.

=== Annual report required from every animal shelter in receipt of state or local funding ===
Every county or city animal shelter, or animal shelter operated under contract with a county or city or otherwise in receipt of State or local funding shall prepare an annual report in the form required by the Department of Agriculture and Consumer Services setting forth the numbers, by species, of animals received into the shelter, the number adopted out, the number returned to owner, and the number destroyed. The report shall also contain the total operating expenses of the shelter and the cost per animal handled. The report must be filed with the Department of Agriculture and Consumer Services by March 1 of each year. A city or county that does not timely file the report is not eligible to receive reimbursement payments under G.S. 19A‑64 during the calendar year in which the report was to be filed.

=== Notification of available funding ===
Prior to January 1 of each year, the Department of Agriculture and Consumer Services must notify counties and cities that have, prior to that notification deadline, established eligibility for distribution of funds from the Spay/Neuter Account of the following:

- The amount of funding in the Spay/Neuter Account that the department will have available for distribution to each county or city receiving notification to pay reimbursement requests submitted by the county or city during the calendar year following the notification deadline; and
- The amount of additional funding, if any, the department estimates, but does not guarantee, may be available to pay reimbursement requests submitted by the notified county or city to the department during the calendar year following the notification deadline.

== Care of animal subjected to illegal treatment ==
In every arrest under any provision of Article 47 of Chapter 14 of the General Statutes or under G.S. 67‑4.3 or upon the commencement of an action under Article 1 of this Chapter by a county or municipality, by a county‑approved animal cruelty investigator, by other county or municipal official, or by an organization operating a county or municipal shelter under contract, if an animal shelter takes custody of an animal, the operator of the shelter may file a petition with the court requesting that the defendant be ordered to deposit funds in an amount sufficient to secure payment of all the reasonable expenses expected to be incurred by the animal shelter in caring for and providing for the animal pending the disposition of the litigation. For purposes of this section, "reasonable expenses" includes the cost of providing food, water, shelter, and care, including medical care, for at least 30 days.

Upon receipt of a petition, the court shall set a hearing on the petition to determine the need to care for and provide for the animal pending the disposition of the litigation. The hearing shall be conducted no less than 10 and no more than 15 business days after the petition is filed. The operator of the animal shelter shall mail written notice of the hearing and a copy of the petition to the defendant at the address contained in the criminal charges or the complaint or summons by which a civil action was initiated. If the defendant is in a local detention facility at the time the petition is filed, the operator of the animal shelter shall also provide notice to the custodian of the detention facility.

The court shall set the amount of funds necessary for 30 days' care after taking into consideration all of the facts and circumstances of the case, including the need to care for and provide for the animal pending the disposition of the litigation, the recommendation of the operator of the animal shelter, the estimated cost of caring for and providing for the animal, and the defendant's ability to pay. If the court determines that the defendant is unable to deposit funds, the court may consider issuing an order under subsection (f) of this section.

Any order for funds to be deposited pursuant to this section shall state that if the operator of the animal shelter files an affidavit with the clerk of superior court, at least two business days prior to the expiration of a 30‑day period, stating that, to the best of the affiant's knowledge, the case against the defendant has not yet been resolved, the order shall be automatically renewed every 30 days until the case is resolved.

If the court orders that funds be deposited, the amount of funds necessary for 30 days shall be posted with the clerk of superior court. The defendant shall also deposit the same amount with the clerk of superior court every 30 days thereafter until the litigation is resolved, unless the defendant requests a hearing no less than five business days prior to the expiration of a 30‑day period. If the defendant fails to deposit the funds within five business days of the initial hearing, or five business days of the expiration of a 30‑day period, the animal is forfeited by operation of law. If funds have been deposited, the operator of the animal shelter may draw from the funds the actual costs incurred in caring for the animal.

In the event of forfeiture, the animal shelter may determine whether the animal is suitable for adoption and if adoption can be arranged for the animal. The animal may not be adopted by the defendant or by any person residing in the defendant's household. If the adopted animal is a dog used for fighting, the animal shelter shall notify any persons adopting the dog of the liability provisions for owners of dangerous dogs under Article 1A of Chapter 67 of the General Statutes. If no adoption can be arranged after the forfeiture, or the animal is unsuitable for adoption, the shelter shall humanely euthanize the animal.

The deposit of funds shall not prevent the animal shelter from disposing of the animal prior to the expiration of the 30‑day period covered by the deposit if the court makes a final determination of the charges or claims against the defendant. Upon determination, the defendant is entitled to a refund for any portion of the deposit not incurred as expenses by the animal shelter. A person who is acquitted of all criminal charges or not found to have committed animal cruelty in a civil action under Article 1 of this Chapter is entitled to a refund of the deposit remaining after any draws from the deposit in accordance with the previous subsection of this section.

Pursuant to subsection (c) of this section, the court may order a defendant to provide necessary food, water, shelter, and care, including any necessary medical care, for any animal that is the basis of the charges or claims against the defendant without the removal of the animal from the existing location and until the charges or claims against the defendant are adjudicated. If the court issues such an order, the court will provide for an animal control officer or other law enforcement officer to make regular visits to the location to ensure that the animal is receiving necessary food, water, shelter, and care, including any necessary medical care, and to impound the animal if it is not receiving those necessities.

== Animal hoarding ==
The act also fights against animal hoarding, or owning more than the usual number of animals as pets, as it can prevent animal hoarders from obtaining new animals. The act specifically targets animal hoarding because acquiring so many animals prevents the owner from providing minimal standards of care. This often leads to disease, starvation, or death, and the conditions can even affect household members.
