= North Carolina Home Economics Association =

- Abbreviation: NCHEA
- Formation: 1917 (formal status 1919)
- Type: Professional association
- Purpose: Promote education, research, and cooperative programs in home economics
- Headquarters: North Carolina, United States
- Affiliations: American Association of Family and Consumer Sciences (AAFCS)

The North Carolina Home Economics Association (NCHEA) was founded in 1917, and achieved formal status in 1919 through the adoption of a constitution and its official name. The association was affiliated with the American Home Economics Association in 1922, a group that was renamed the American Association of Family and Consumer Sciences (AAFCS) in 1994.

The purpose of the NCHEA is to promote education, research and cooperative programs and to disseminate information in the field of home economics. The association's programs have been concerned with family research, consumer issues, services for children, nutrition, and problems confronting the elderly and the handicapped.

Membership is gained automatically by state residents who join the AAFCS, and includes professionals working in government agencies, private enterprise and education. Membership is furthermore made up of three separate groupings, six regional groups, six subject matter sections and eight professional sections. The NCHEA is supported by an elected board of directors.
