= North Carolina Boys Choir =

The North Carolina Boys Choir was founded in 1971 by Dr. William J. Graham, in Durham, NC, who directed the choir until late 2014. Originally named the Durham Boychoir, it was designated the state boys choir of North Carolina in 1983 by Governor Jim Hunt. In 1992 the chamber choir of tenors and basses was founded to supplement the touring concert choir. Since its inception, the choir concludes each semester with a concert in Duke Chapel at Duke University.

The North Carolina Boys Choir's mission is to provide life-enhancing experiences through the study and performance of great choral music. The Choir strives to inspire a lifelong enjoyment of singing and encourage singing both in the family and throughout the community.

== Structure ==
The North Carolina Boys Choir is composed of four choirs:

The training choir is composed of boys and girls in preparation for joining the concert choir or Prima ensemble. This group typically contains 8-10 year-olds, who spend one or more semesters in this group before being considered for promotion into the concert choir or Prima. Auditions are held upon request.

The concert choir of boys features first sopranos, second sopranos, and altos. This group currently consists of about 10 boys, ages ranging from nine to 13. Each year the choir takes a "mini-tour." In 2005 the choir completed an international tour with performances in the United Kingdom.

The chamber choir of tenors and basses is composed of graduates of the concert choir, area men, and fathers of boys in the concert choir.

After training choir, girls may enter the Prima choir.

== Staff ==
Robert Unger brings a wide variety of teaching and conducting experiences to the choir. He is Director of Worship and Music at Resurrection Lutheran Church, Cary, NC; the former Artistic Director and conductor of The Raleigh Boychoir, Raleigh, NC; and, previously, a Co-founder and Conductor of the Badger State Girl Choir, Neenah, WI; and a conductor of the Appleton Boychoir, Appleton, WI. He is an accomplished organist, Handbell choir director, and experienced private voice/piano/organ instructor. He has over thirty-five years of choral conducting experience.

David Cole has been the accompanist for the NC Boys and Girls Choirs for six years. As an alumnus and former board member of The Raleigh Boychoir, his experience in that ensemble inspired David to study the organ, church music and liturgy in college and graduate school. He has served as a church and community choir director and organist in several states over the course of sixteen years. Presently he serves First Baptist Church, Henderson, NC as Associate Minister of Music, and is in demand as an accompanist and vocal coach throughout the NC Triangle.
