= North Carolina Black Film Festival =

North Carolina Black Film Festival is a yearly film festival that focuses primarily on works by Black or ethnic members of the film industry. The festival is held annually and features full-length narratives, short films, mobile entertainment as "all short form content including experimental films, music videos and webisodes", and documentaries, all by and/or featuring Black or ethnic writers, directors, actors, and actresses. The purpose of the North Carolina Black Film Festival is to publicly recognize, celebrate, and promote the work of ethnic film makers and to encourage film production and culture within the film industry in a highly competitive selection process.
