= North Carolina Structured Sentencing Act =

The North Carolina Structured Sentencing Act was adopted and implemented in order to give the judge a specific set of standards to follow when sentencing a person. There was a need to change the way that criminals were sentenced in order to lower the prison population, and ensure that the people that were spending time in prison were there for necessary reasons, and that they were serving an adequate amount of time based on their criminal history, and their current level of crime. The structured sentencing act put fair and clear cut guidelines for a judge to follow, while ensuring the publics interest was still being looked after.

== History ==
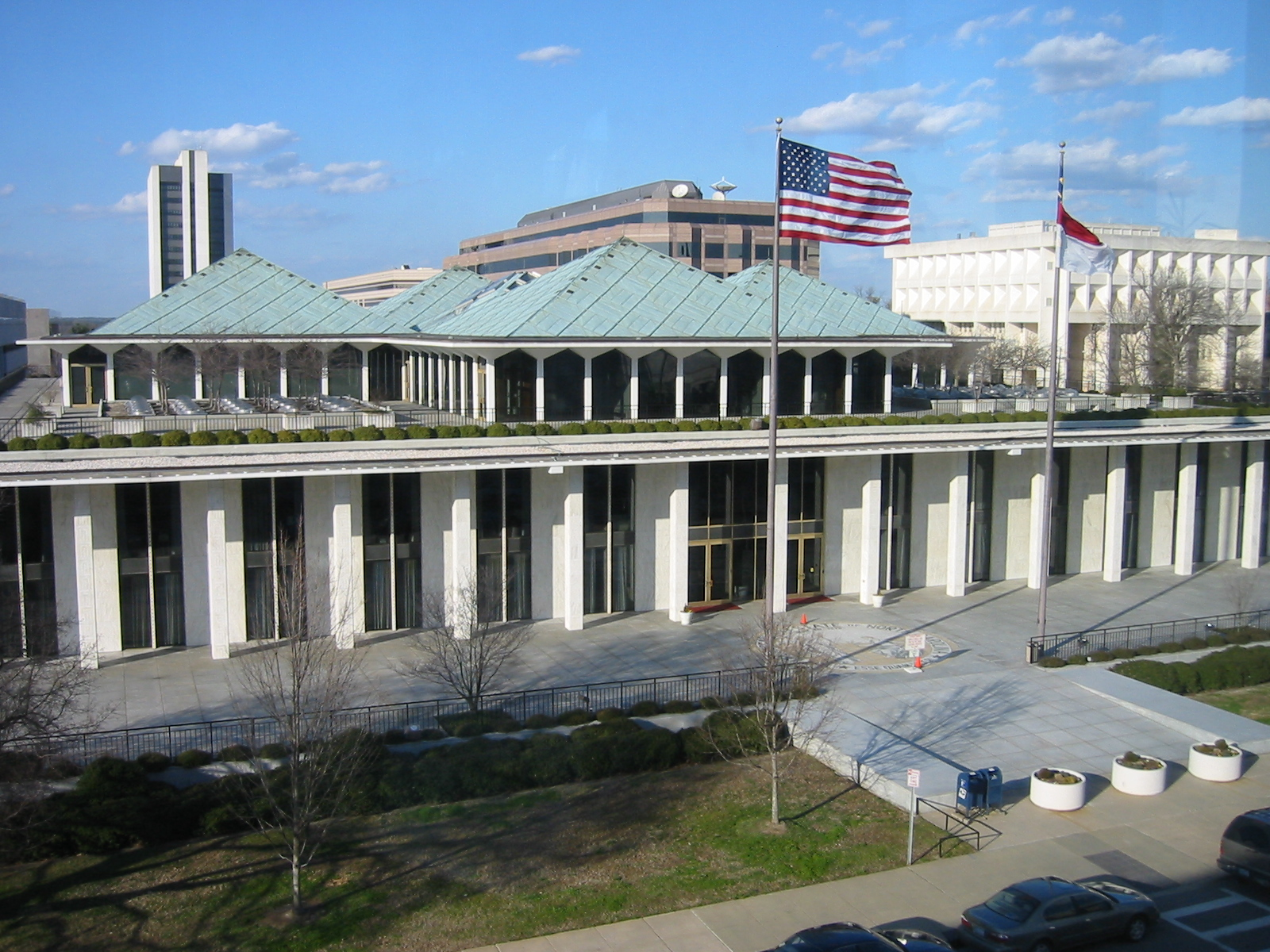
North Carolina Legislative Building

North Carolina was suffering from a growing prison population and not enough facilities to house the increase in the number of beds that would be needed based on projections. The information obtained from these projections led North Carolina to create the North Carolina Sentencing and Policy Advisory Commission in 1990 to evaluate and recommend a new procedure to help remedy this upcoming problem. The advisory board looked at the different prison population statistics along with the offender records, and the punishments that were received. Based on this information they developed a recommendation that was delivered to the General Assembly in 1993. The General Assembly reviewed, amended, and finally adopted the act. This became the structured sentencing act, this set up guidelines to follow for all felonies and misdemeanors, and this would outline the sentence that an offender would receive. These guidelines went into effect October 1, 1994. Since the original guidelines went into effect there have been two revisions to the original document and those took place in 1995 and 2009 during the legislative sessions. The 2009 version is the current guidelines that are being used today and affect anybody who committed a crime after December 1, 2009.

== Procedures of structured sentencing ==
=== Record levels ===
In the structured sentencing guidelines it sets the courts up to look at a person's prior criminal history. This is used to evaluate the person, and then place them in one of six different categories, or record levels. The more violent offenses or people who have a large number of prior offenses will be placed in the highest category, while a person who has no prior convictions or very few will be placed into the lower categories. These categories are used to help determine the sentence length and type of punishment that a person will receive for the crime that is committed.

=== Crime categorization ===
Felony crimes are broken down into several different categories as well ranging from Class A through Class I. If a crime involves another person and there is a victim, the person will be assigned to the highest class, which is class A. If the crime is a property crime and there is no victim in the crime, this will be the lowest class of felony crimes, which is a class I. These classifications in crimes are used in conjunction with the guidelines that have been put forth for sentencing. The guidelines set a minimum, as well as a maximum that a person can receive based on the category of the crime, and their record level. Under the structured sentencing act a person must serve at least the minimum, and no more than the maximum. This was a change that was made from the old sentencing. In the old way of sentencing a person would have a sentence given to them, and through different programs and good behavior they could earn time off their sentence, and be released on parole earlier than the minimum time. The structured sentencing did away with parole all together, and made it mandatory to serve at least the minimum sentence based on the guidelines. Good behavior and programs still could be used to earn time off, which helped people to be released by the minimum instead of having to serve the full maximum sentence.

=== Sentencing guidelines ===
The guidelines break the sentencing down even further based on mitigating and aggravating circumstances. There is a set sentence, or presumptive sentence, that is the standard for a person to be sentenced, but they could receive more or less based on different factors. These factors are mitigating and aggravating. Mitigating factors could be anything from time at a job, family situation, or different actions that were taken after committing the crime that will look good and act in their favor, such as anger management classes or substance abuse classes. These different situations will be used in court to make a person's situation more desirable, and the judge can then use these circumstances to move the person into the mitigating category of punishments. The over side of that is the aggravating factors. These could include if the person has not followed through with court recommendations, or if the defendant does not have a job or any sort of history of stability in their life. The different factors are the main area that a judge can adjust a sentence, although for the most part people will receive the presumptive sentence.

== Punishments ==
Once the sentence has been determined there are three different types of punishment that a person can receive. These are based on the severity of crime as well as the record level that a person is placed in. There is some leeway in most crimes as to what punishment is given, but many of the higher offenses, and lower offenses are set to be given a specific punishment.

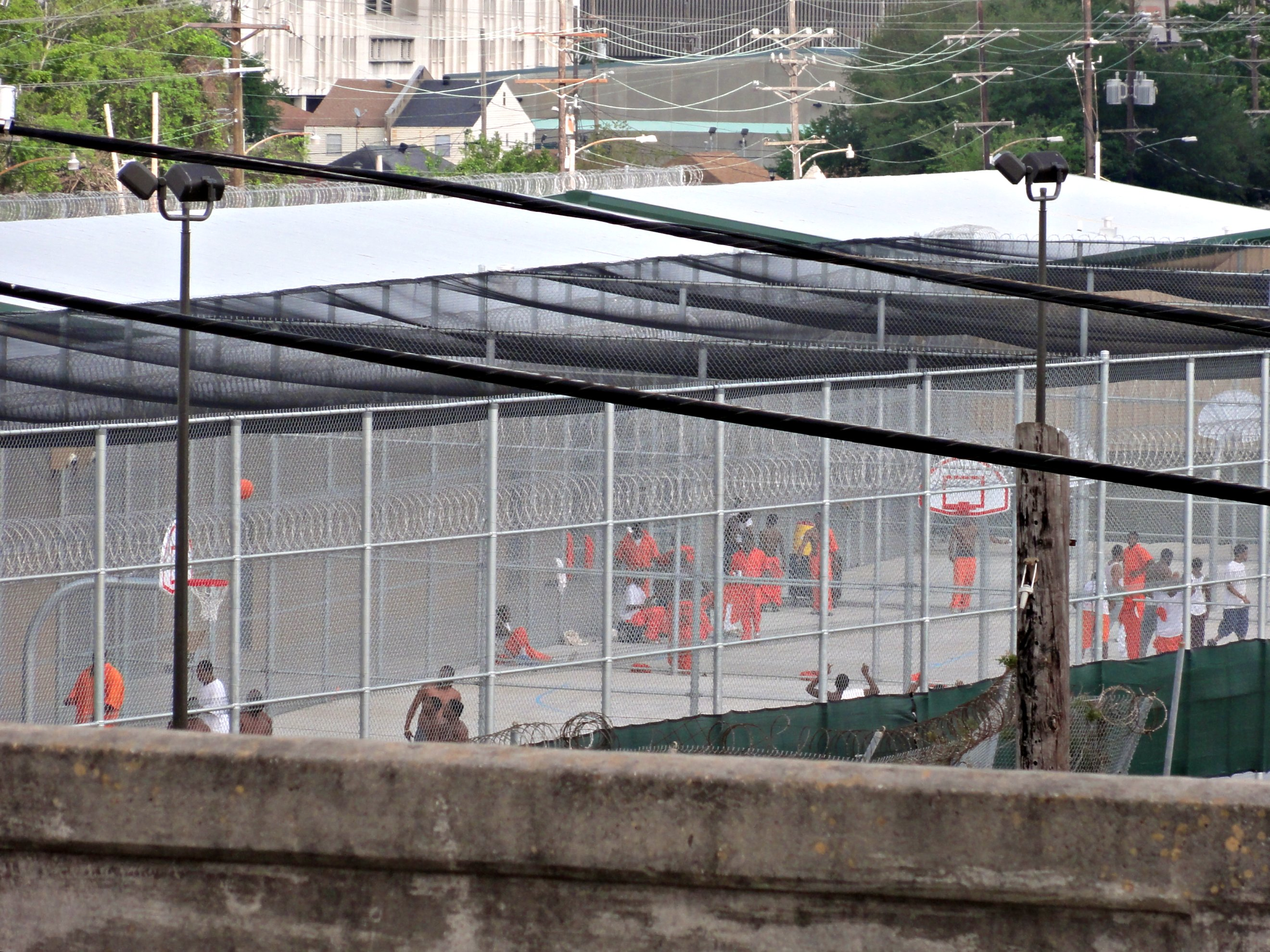
Inmates in a prison yard

=== Active ===
If a person receives an active sentence then they must serve their time in jail or prison. Active sentences are given if the person is convicted of a felony that falls into the high offense level of crimes, or if they have a bad prior record of crimes. Once a person is sentenced to active time they must complete their entire time in the prison. There is no ability to parole under the minimum sentence.

=== Intermediate ===
Intermediate sentencing is a mid-way point in sentencing. It helps to keep the prison population down, while still imposing strict guidelines that the person must follow. Intermediate sentencing consists of two parts. The first part is supervised probation, and in order for it to be considered an intermediate sentence it must include at least one of the following additional requirements-

- Special probation- The offender must participate in a period of confinement, followed by probation. Also referred to as split sentences.
- Residential program - The offender must live in a designated facility and participate in different activities to help with different problems. These activities could include anything from counseling to job skills training.
- House arrest with electronic monitoring- The offender is confined to their home for a certain length of time. In order to leave the residence the offender must receive special permission from the court. The offender also will wear a monitoring device that the courts can track location at any time.
- Intensive supervision-This goes beyond regular probation and involves stricter set of guidelines that the offender must comply with, usually involving specific times that the offender must be home and the ability to impose random searches in the residence, the judge could expand upon these to add different guidelines that the offender must follow.
- Day reporting center-The offender has a specific time and place that they must report to on a daily basis to participate in different activities. The activities are very similar to those in the residential programs, but do not require the offender to live at the facility.
- Drug treatment program-The offender must participate and pass through a drug rehabilitation program.

=== Community ===
If an offender receives a community punishment it could include a variety of things. Community is the least severe of punishments and could include anything from a basic fine to supervised probation. The main difference in the probation from the intermediate level to the community level is that it does not have to be accompanied by another requirement. The probation could also be unsupervised or supervised. If the offender receives supervised probation then they must report on a regular basis to a probation officer to follow up with them and ensure that they are staying out of trouble. Unsupervised probation does not require the offender to check in with anyone, but does hold a suspended sentence that could turn into a supervised, intermediate, or an active sentence if they violate the terms of the probation. If probation is not given then they may receive community service or a fine. If a fine is imposed than they must pay that and they are finished with the punishment of that crime.

== Evaluations and response to the act ==
=== Recognition ===
In 1997 the Ford Foundation and Harvard University recognized the North Carolina Structured Sentencing Act as one of their ten recipients for the Innovations in American Government award. They highlighted the way that it took into account the resources that the state had and balanced them with the state policies. They described the felony sentencing structure as " the centerpiece of an innovative sentencing law that...put North Carolina in the forefront of a nascent but increasingly popular concept of criminal justice: balancing prison sentence with available cell capacity."

It was because of these innovations and the success of the new program that led other states to follow suit. One of the more known cases of this is in Georgia. Georgia was formerly known for having one of the "toughest" sentences. This was attributed to the amount of time-served as well as how easily it was to be sent to prison. After evaluating North Carolinas structured sentencing, Georgia decided to move in the same direction.

A few of the main problems have been corrected due to the change in sentencing. This has almost completely eliminated unfair sentencing between whites and blacks. It is easier to predict what a sentence length will be, the sentences tend to be around the same length for the same crime, and the time being served is shorter than in the past. There also has not been much of a change between people receiving prison time versus probation.

=== Criticism ===
One of the problems that has been found with this sort of sentencing is that there are more infractions committed while incarcerated. Under the old system inmates had the ability to earn time through good behavior. This was a motivation for many inmates to behave while they were incarcerated. Once the structured sentencing act took over there was no way to be released earlier than the minimum. This removed the motivation to behave while incarcerated. The infraction rate went up by 25% in males and 55% in females. A study has shown that the increase in infractions could be just as detrimental to the overall safety of the prison as overcrowding could have.

Another main complaint is that there are exceptions to the guidelines. There are three crimes that do not follow the guidelines. This includes DWIs, drug trafficking, and sexual offenses. The reason for these three being excluded is that it was felt that there should be stricter punishments for these crimes then the guidelines would allow. This has caused them to be excluded and they are punished under the old set of rules.

=== Justice Reinvestment Act ===
On January 1, 2012, a new law, the Justice Reinvestment Act, went into effect. This new law, enacted by the legislature in 2011, moves back towards parole and goes against the structured sentencing guidelines. This allows good behavior to be rewarded and early release with advanced supervision.
