= Urban League of Central Carolinas =

Urban League of Central Carolinas, previously known as the Charlotte-Mecklenburg Urban League, is the division of the National Urban League, nonpartisan civil rights organization, in Charlotte, North Carolina.

== Background ==
The Urban League was organized on November 6, 1978, to promote economic self-sufficiency among African American families and to seek racial inclusion in Mecklenburg County.

== Programs ==
In the 1990s the league focused on employment, education and racial inclusion. It offered programs including evening computer classes, mortgage counseling programs and basic skills training.

On August 10, 2022. the Urban League of Central Carolinas opened its Digital Innovation Center in a new building in East Charlotte.
