= Outline of North Carolina =

Overview of and topical guide to North Carolina

The flag of North Carolina

The seal of North Carolina

The location of the State of North Carolina in the United States of America

The following outline is provided as an overview of and topical guide to the U.S. state of North Carolina. Wikipedia:WikiProject North Carolina Category:Top-importance North Carolina articles are indicated.

North Carolina – U.S. state on the Eastern Seaboard, bordering the North Atlantic Ocean in the Southeastern United States. North Carolina was one of the original Thirteen Colonies and signed the United States Declaration of Independence on July 4, 1776. North Carolina was the 12th of the original 13 states to approve the Constitution of the United States of America on January 2, 1788. North Carolina joined the Confederate States of America during the American Civil War from 1861 to 1865, and following the war was readmitted to the Union in 1868.

== General reference ==
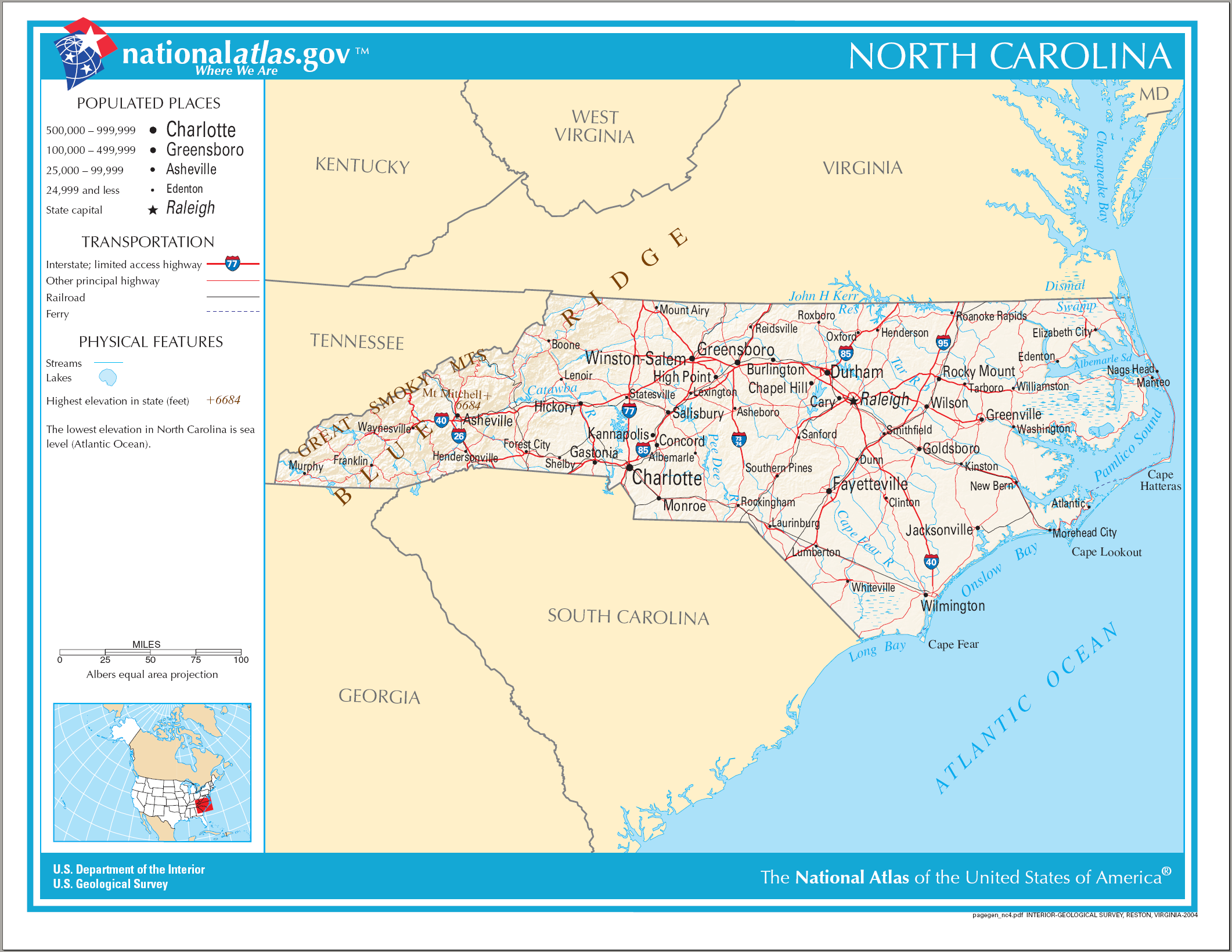
An enlargeable map of the State of North Carolina

- Names
  - Common name: North Carolina
    - Pronunciation: /ˌkærəˈlaɪnə/
  - Official name: State of North Carolina
  - Abbreviations and name codes
    - Postal symbol: NC
    - ISO 3166-2 code: US-NC
    - Internet second-level domain: .nc.us
  - Nicknames
    - Old North State
    - Tar Heel State
    - Turpentine State
    - Variety Vacationland
    - Rip Van Winkle State
    - Land of the Sky
    - First in Flight State (currently used on license plates)
- Adjectivals: North Carolina, North Carolinian
- Demonym: North Carolinian

== Geography of North Carolina ==
Geography of North Carolina

- North Carolina is: a U.S. state, a federal state of the United States of America
- Location
  - Northern Hemisphere
  - Western Hemisphere
    - Americas
      - North America
        - Anglo America
        - Northern America
          - United States of America
            - Contiguous United States
              - Eastern United States
                - East Coast of the United States
              - Southern United States
                - Southeastern United States
                  - South Atlantic States
- Population of North Carolina: 10,439,388 (2020 U.S. Census)
- Area of North Carolina: 53,819.2 sq mi (139,391.0 km^{2})
- Atlas of North Carolina
- commons:Category:North Carolina

=== Places in North Carolina ===
- Historic places in North Carolina
  - National Historic Landmarks in North Carolina
  - National Register of Historic Places listings in North Carolina
    - Bridges on the National Register of Historic Places in North Carolina
- National Natural Landmarks in North Carolina
- List of National Park Service areas in North Carolina
- State parks in North Carolina

=== Environment of North Carolina ===
- Climate of North Carolina
- Protected areas in North Carolina
  - State forests of North Carolina
- Superfund sites in North Carolina
- Wildlife of North Carolina
  - Fauna of North Carolina
  - Birds of North Carolina
- Tidewater region of North Carolina

==== Natural geographic features of North Carolina ====
- List of mountains in North Carolina
- List of rivers of North Carolina

=== Regions of North Carolina ===
- Piedmont (United States)
- Eastern North Carolina
- Northeastern North Carolina
- Cape Fear (region)
- Western North Carolina
- Piedmont Triad

==== Administrative divisions of North Carolina ====
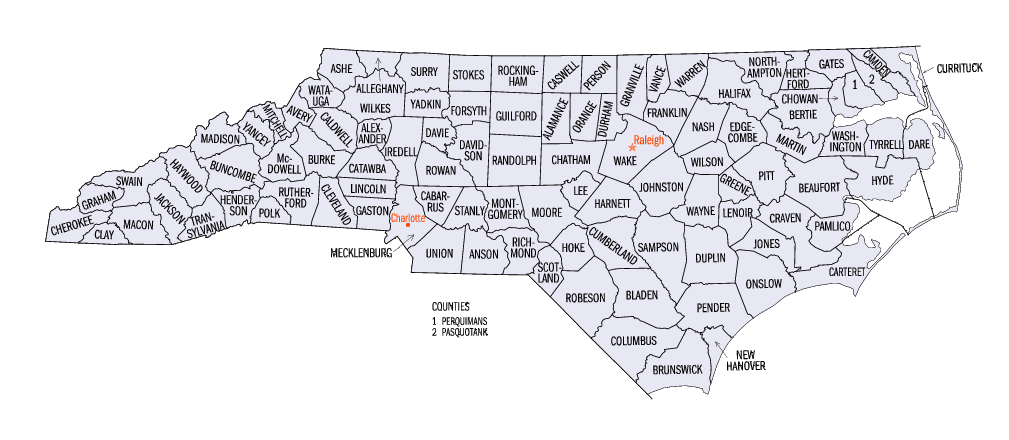
An enlargeable map of the 100 counties of the State of North Carolina

- The 100 Counties of the State of North Carolina
  - Municipalities in North Carolina
    - Cities in North Carolina
      - State capital of North Carolina:
      - City nicknames in North Carolina
      - Sister cities in North Carolina
    - Unincorporated communities in North Carolina
  - List of townships in North Carolina

=== Demography of North Carolina ===
Demographics of North Carolina

- Slaves

== Politics and government of North Carolina ==
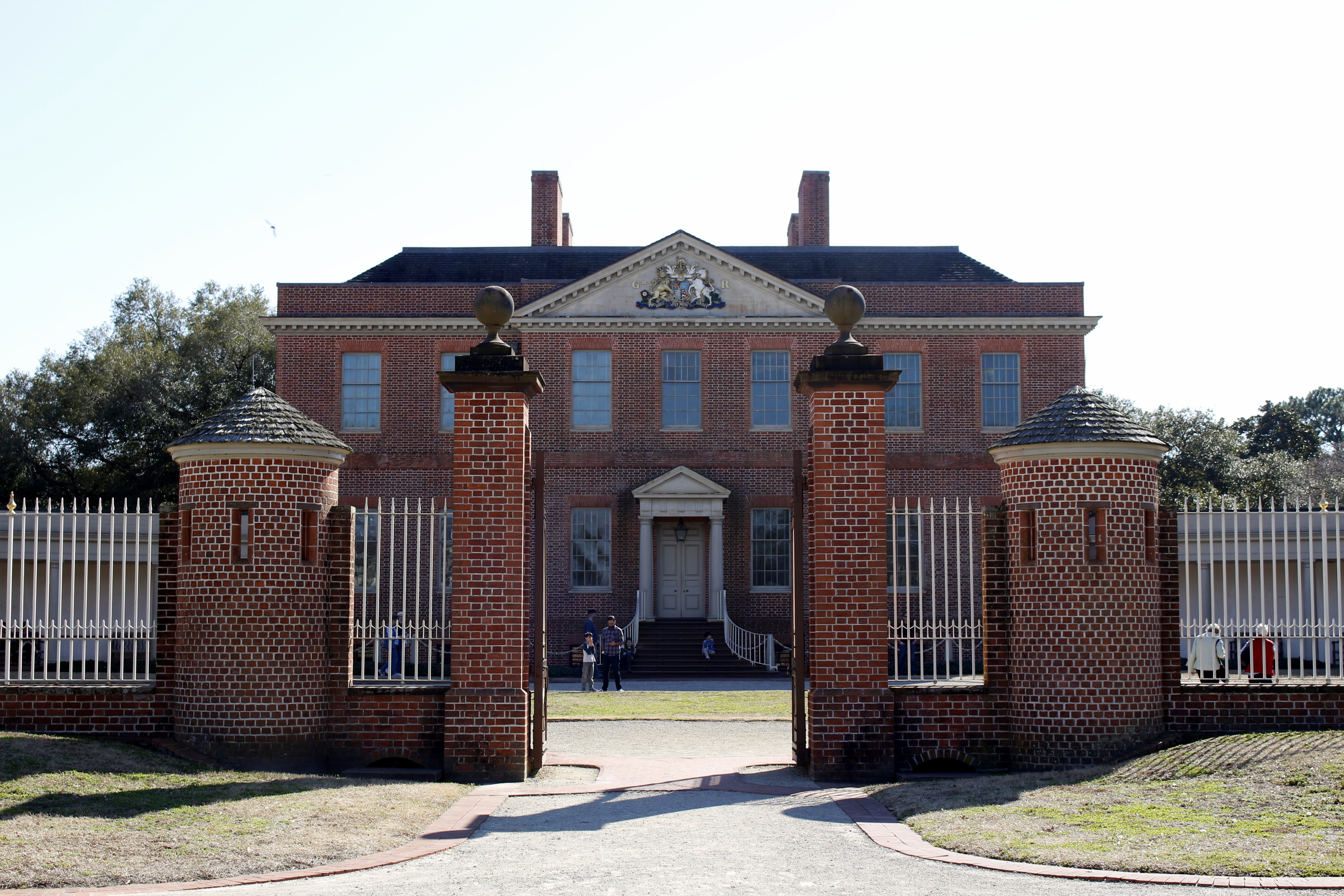
Tryon Palace

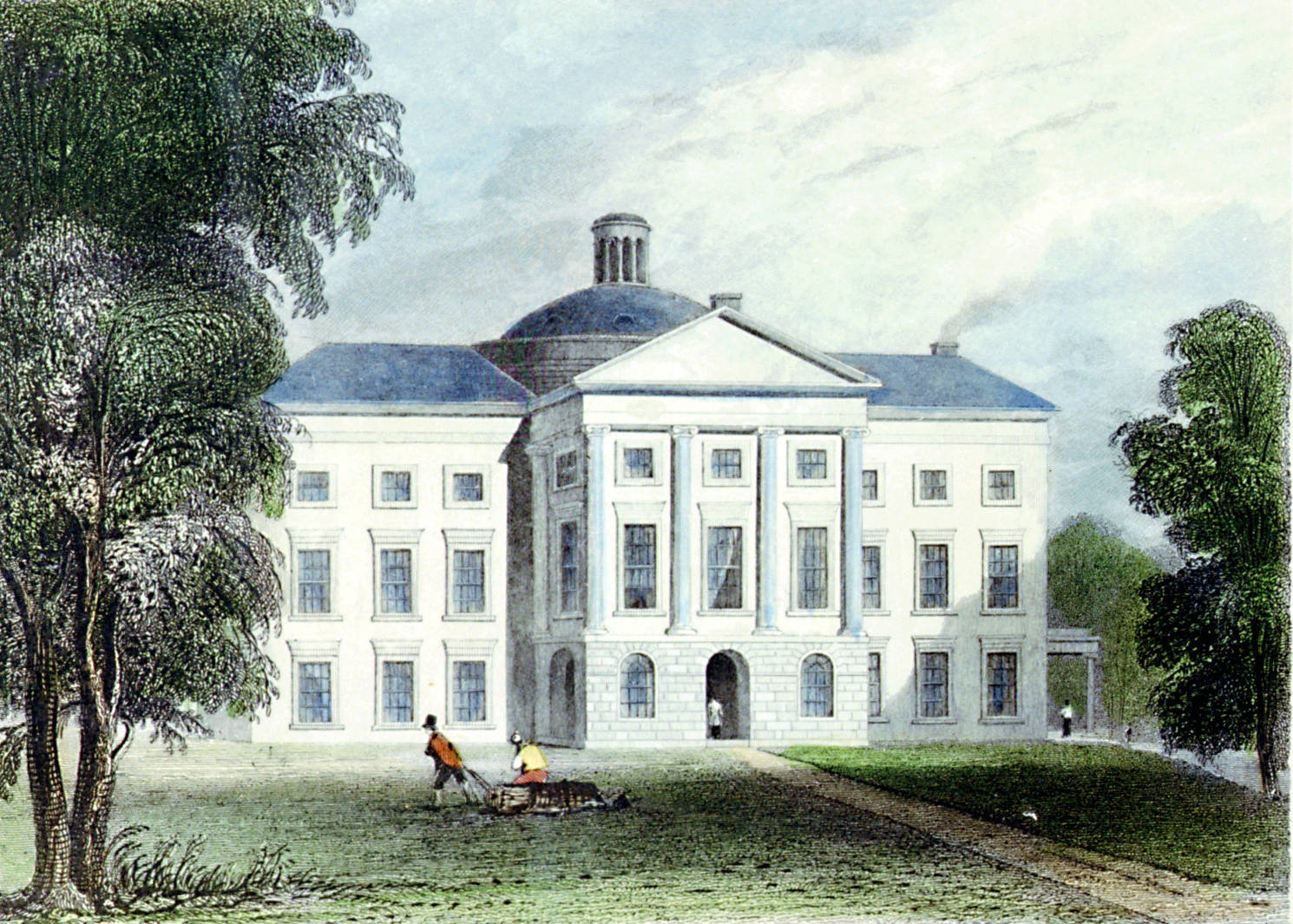
North Carolina State House

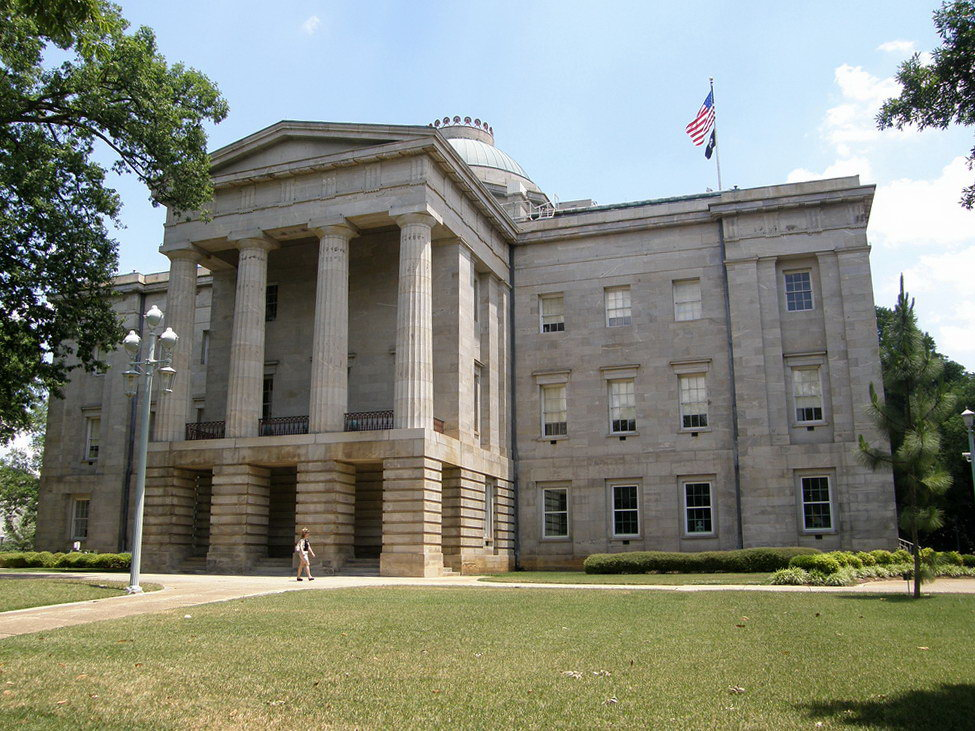
North Carolina State Capitol

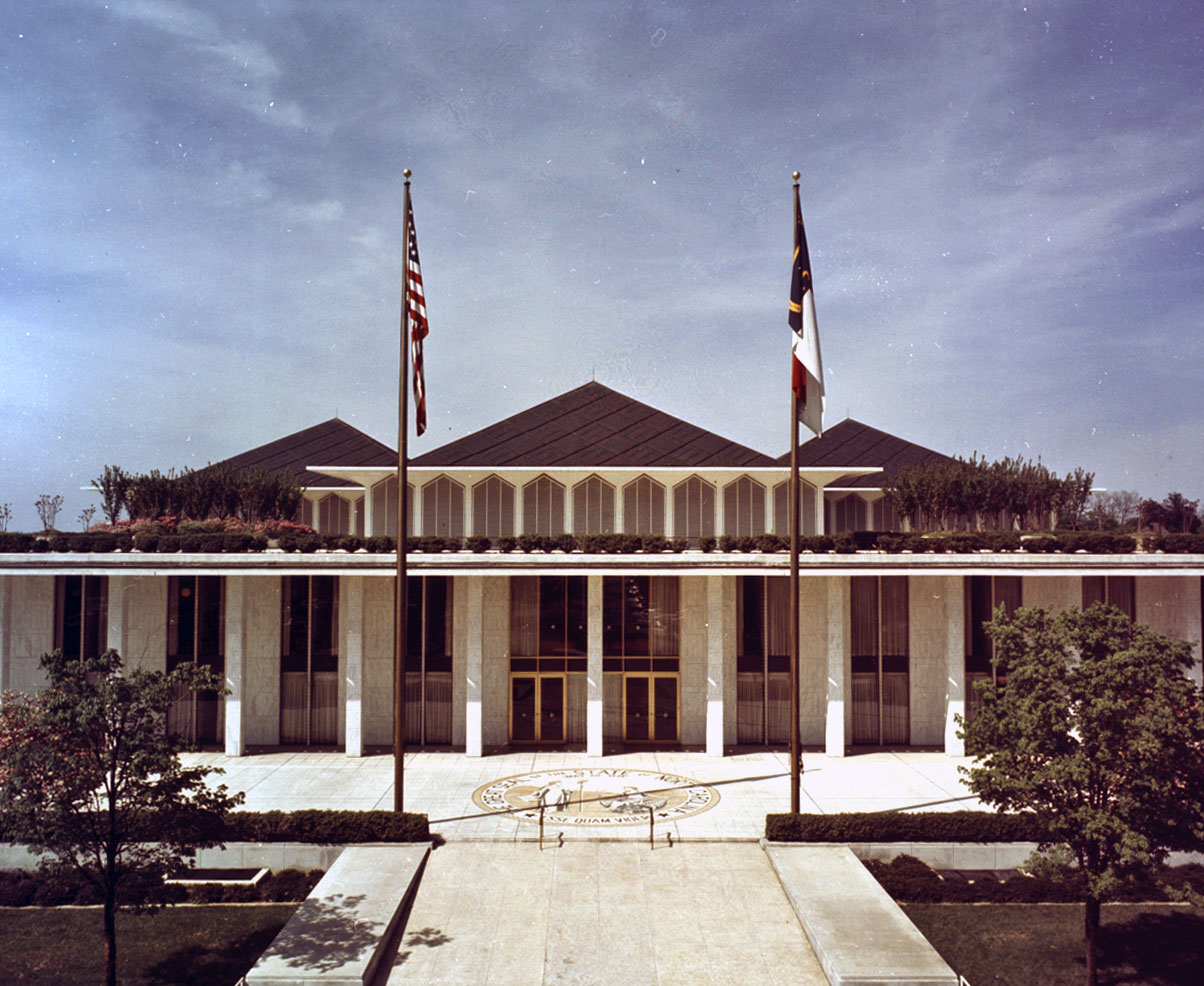
State Legislative Building

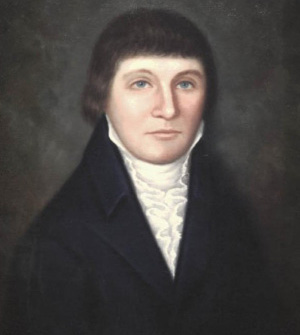
1st Governor Richard Caswell

1st Chief Justice John Louis Taylor

Government of North Carolina

- Form of government: U.S. state government
- North Carolina's congressional delegations
- North Carolina State Capitols
  - Tryon Palace (1777)
  - North Carolina State House (1794–1831)
  - North Carolina State Capitol (1840–1961)
  - North Carolina State Legislative Building (1963–present)
- Elections in North Carolina
  - Electoral reform in North Carolina
  - Political party strength in North Carolina
- State agencies
  - List of North Carolina state agencies

=== Branches of the government in North Carolina ===
==== Executive branch of the government in North Carolina ====
- Council of State of North Carolina
  - Governor of North Carolina
  - Lieutenant Governor of North Carolina
  - North Carolina Commissioner of Agriculture
  - North Carolina Attorney General
  - Auditor of North Carolina
  - North Carolina Commissioner of Labor
  - North Carolina Commissioner of Insurance
  - North Carolina Secretary of State
  - North Carolina State Treasurer
  - North Carolina Superintendent of Public Instruction
- North Carolina Cabinet
  - North Carolina Department of Administration
  - North Carolina Department of Commerce
  - North Carolina Department of Environmental Quality
  - North Carolina Department of Health and Human Services
  - North Carolina Department of Information Technology
  - North Carolina Department of Military and Veterans Affairs
  - North Carolina Department of Natural and Cultural Resources
  - North Carolina Department of Public Safety
  - North Carolina Department of Revenue
  - North Carolina Department of Transportation

==== Legislative branch of the government in North Carolina ====
- North Carolina General Assembly (bicameral)
  - Upper house: North Carolina Senate
  - Lower house: House of Commons/House of Representatives
- List of North Carolina state legislatures (1777–present)

==== Judicial branch of the government in North Carolina ====
- North Carolina Supreme Court
  - North Carolina Court of Appeals
    - North Carolina District Courts (45 districts)
- Federal Courts in North Carolina

==== County and City Governments in North Carolina ====
- List of law enforcement agencies in North Carolina
- North Carolina justice of the peace
- North Carolina Councils of Governments
- Category:Lists of mayors of places in North Carolina
- Category:North Carolina city council members
- Category:County officials in North Carolina
  - Category:County commissioners in North Carolina
  - Category:District attorneys in North Carolina
  - Category:North Carolina sheriffs
  - Category:Sheriffs' offices of North Carolina
  - Category:County police departments of North Carolina

=== Law and order in North Carolina ===
- Law of North Carolina
  - Constitution of North Carolina
- Specific laws and judgements
  - Cannabis in North Carolina
  - Individuals executed in North Carolina
  - Crime in North Carolina
  - Gun laws in North Carolina
  - Same-sex marriage in North Carolina

== North Carolina military units ==
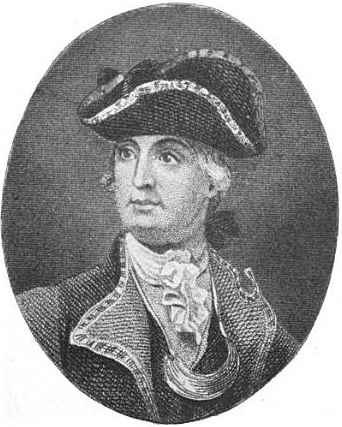
Maj Gen Robert Howe, North Carolina Line

Current

- North Carolina Air National Guard
- North Carolina Army National Guard

Revolutionary War

- List of North Carolina militia units in the American Revolution
- North Carolina Line
- North Carolina state troops in the American Revolution

Civil War

- List of North Carolina Confederate Civil War units
- List of North Carolina Union Civil War regiments

== History of North Carolina ==
History of North Carolina

=== History of North Carolina, by period ===
Pre-history

- Indigenous peoples
  - Mississippian culture
    - Joara
- Spanish colony of Florida, 1565–1763
  - Fort San Juan at Joara, 1567–1568
- English Colony of Roanoke, 1585–1587

Colonial period

- Province of Carolina
  - English, 1663–1707
  - French colony of Louisiane, 1699–1763
  - British, 1707–1712
- Province of North Carolina
  - British, 1712–1776
  - French and Indian War, 1754–1763
  - Treaty of Fontainebleau of 1762
  - Treaty of Paris of 1763
  - British Indian Reserve, 1763–1783
  - Royal Proclamation of 1763

Revolutionary War period

- North Carolina Provincial Congress 1774-1776
- Rowan Resolves 1774
- Mecklenburg Resolves 1775
- Tryon Resolves 1775
- Halifax Resolves 1776
- Cherokee–American wars, 1776–1794
- United States Declaration of Independence, July 4, 1776
- First General Assembly
- Tenth state to ratify the Articles of Confederation and Perpetual Union, signed July 21, 1778
- North Carolina in the American Revolutionary War April 19, 1775 – September 3, 1783
- Treaty of Paris, September 3, 1783

Post Revolution

- State of Franklin, 1784
- Hillsborough Convention of 1788 (U.S. Constitution)
- Fayetteville Convention of 1789 (U.S. Constitution)
- Twelfth State to ratify the Constitution of the United States of America on November 21, 1789
- Southwest Territory, 1790
- War of 1812, June 18, 1812 – March 23, 1815
  - Treaty of Ghent, December 24, 1814
- Trail of Tears, 1830–1838
- North Carolina Constitutional Convention of 1835
- James K. Polk becomes 11th President of the United States on March 4, 1845,

Civil War

- American Civil War, April 12, 1861 – May 13, 1865
- North Carolina in the American Civil War
- Tenth state admitted to the Confederate States of America on May 21, 1861
- Carolinas campaign, January 5 – April 26, 1865

Post Civil War

- Andrew Johnson becomes 17th President of the United States on April 15, 1865
- North Carolina in Reconstruction, 1865–1868
- Fourth former Confederate state readmitted to the United States on July 4, 1868
- North Carolina Constitution of 1868
- Kirk-Holden War, 1870

Modern era

=== History of North Carolina, by region ===
By city

- History of Asheville
- History of Cary
- History of Chapel Hill
- History of Charlotte
- History of Concord
- History of Durham
- History of Fayetteville
- History of Gastonia
- History of Greensboro
- History of Greenville
- History of High Point
- History of Jacksonville
- History of Raleigh (capital)
- History of Rocky Mount
- Statesville
- History of Wilson
- History of Wilmington
- History of Winston-Salem

By county

- History of Alamance County
- History of Alexander County
- History of Alleghany County
- History of Anson County
- History of Ashe County
- History of Avery County
- History of Beaufort County
- History of Bertie County
- History of Bladen County
- History of Brunswick County
- History of Buncombe County
- History of Burke County
- History of Cabarrus County
- History of Caldwell County
- History of Camden County
- History of Carteret County
- History of Caswell County
- History of Catawba County
- History of Chatham County
- History of Cherokee County
- History of Chowan County
- History of Clay County
- History of Cleveland County
- History of Columbus County
- History of Craven County
- History of Cumberland County
- History of Currituck County
- History of Dare County
- History of Davidson County
- History of Davie County
- History of Duplin County
- History of Durham County
- History of Edgecombe County
- History of Forsyth County
- History of Franklin County
- History of Gaston County
- History of Gates County
- History of Graham County
- History of Granville County
- History of Greene County
- History of Guilford County
- History of Halifax County
- History of Harnett County
- History of Haywood County
- History of Henderson County
- History of Hertford County
- History of Hoke County
- History of Hyde County
- History of Iredell County
- History of Jackson County
- History of Johnston County
- History of Jones County
- History of Lee County
- History of Lenoir County
- History of Lincoln County
- History of Macon County
- History of Madison County
- History of Martin County
- History of McDowell County
- History of Mecklenburg County
- History of Mitchell County
- History of Montgomery County
- History of Moore County
- History of Nash County
- History of New Hanover County
- History of Northampton County
- History of Onslow County
- History of Orange County
- History of Pamlico County
- History of Pasquotank County
- History of Pender County
- History of Perquimans County
- History of Person County
- History of Pitt County
- History of Polk County
- History of Randolph County
- History of Richmond County
- History of Robeson County
- History of Rockingham County
- History of Rowan County
- History of Rutherford County
- History of Sampson County
- History of Scotland County
- History of Stanly County
- History of Stokes County
- History of Surry County
- History of Swain County
- History of Transylvania County
- History of Tyrrell County
- History of Union County
- History of Vance County
- History of Wake County
- History of Warren County
- History of Washington County
- History of Watauga County
- History of Wayne County
- History of Wilkes County
- History of Wilson County
- History of Wilson County
- History of Yadkin County
- History of Yancey County

Former counties:

- Washington County, North Carolina, established 1777
- Sullivan County, North Carolina, established 1779
- Davidson County, North Carolina, established 1783
- Greene County, North Carolina, established 1783
- Hawkins County, North Carolina, established 1786
- Sumner County, North Carolina, established 1786
- Tennessee County, established 1788, divided at Tennessee statehood in 1796 into Montgomery County, Tennessee and Robertson County, Tennessee
- Albemarle
- Bath
- Bute
- Dobbs
- Tryon

=== History of North Carolina, by subject ===
- Effects of Hurricane Charley in North Carolina
- Effects of Hurricane Helene in North Carolina
- List of North Carolina state legislatures
- History of North Carolina State University
- History of slavery in North Carolina

== Culture of North Carolina ==
Culture of North Carolina

- Museums in North Carolina
- Religion in North Carolina
  - The Church of Jesus Christ of Latter-day Saints in North Carolina
  - Episcopal Diocese of North Carolina
- Scouting in North Carolina
- State symbols of North Carolina
  - Flag of North Carolina
  - Great Seal of the State of North Carolina
- Barbecue in North Carolina

=== The Arts in North Carolina ===
- Music of North Carolina
- Theater in North Carolina
- North Carolina literature

=== Sports in North Carolina ===
Sports in North Carolina

- Professional sports teams in North Carolina

== Economy and infrastructure of North Carolina ==
Economy of North Carolina

- Communications in North Carolina
  - Newspapers in North Carolina
  - Radio stations in North Carolina
  - Television stations in North Carolina
- Energy in North Carolina
  - Power stations in North Carolina
  - Solar power in North Carolina
  - Wind power in North Carolina
- Health care in North Carolina
  - Hospitals in North Carolina
- Transportation in North Carolina
  - Airports in North Carolina
  - Railroads in North Carolina
  - Highways in North Carolina

== Education in North Carolina ==
Education in North Carolina

- List of school districts in North Carolina
  - List of high schools in North Carolina
- List of colleges and universities in North Carolina
  - University of North Carolina System
  - North Carolina Community College System

== See also ==
- Topic overview:
  - North Carolina
  - Index of North Carolina-related articles
