= List of National Park Service areas in North Carolina =

National parks in North Carolina

There are 13 National parks in North Carolina. Only the Great Smoky Mountains National Park is a traditional park. The Great Smoky Mountains National Park is also a World Heritage Site. Other parks include heritage areas, historic sites, national seashores, historic trails, and memorials managed by the National Park Service. Several of the parks include other states besides North Carolina.

== Areas ==
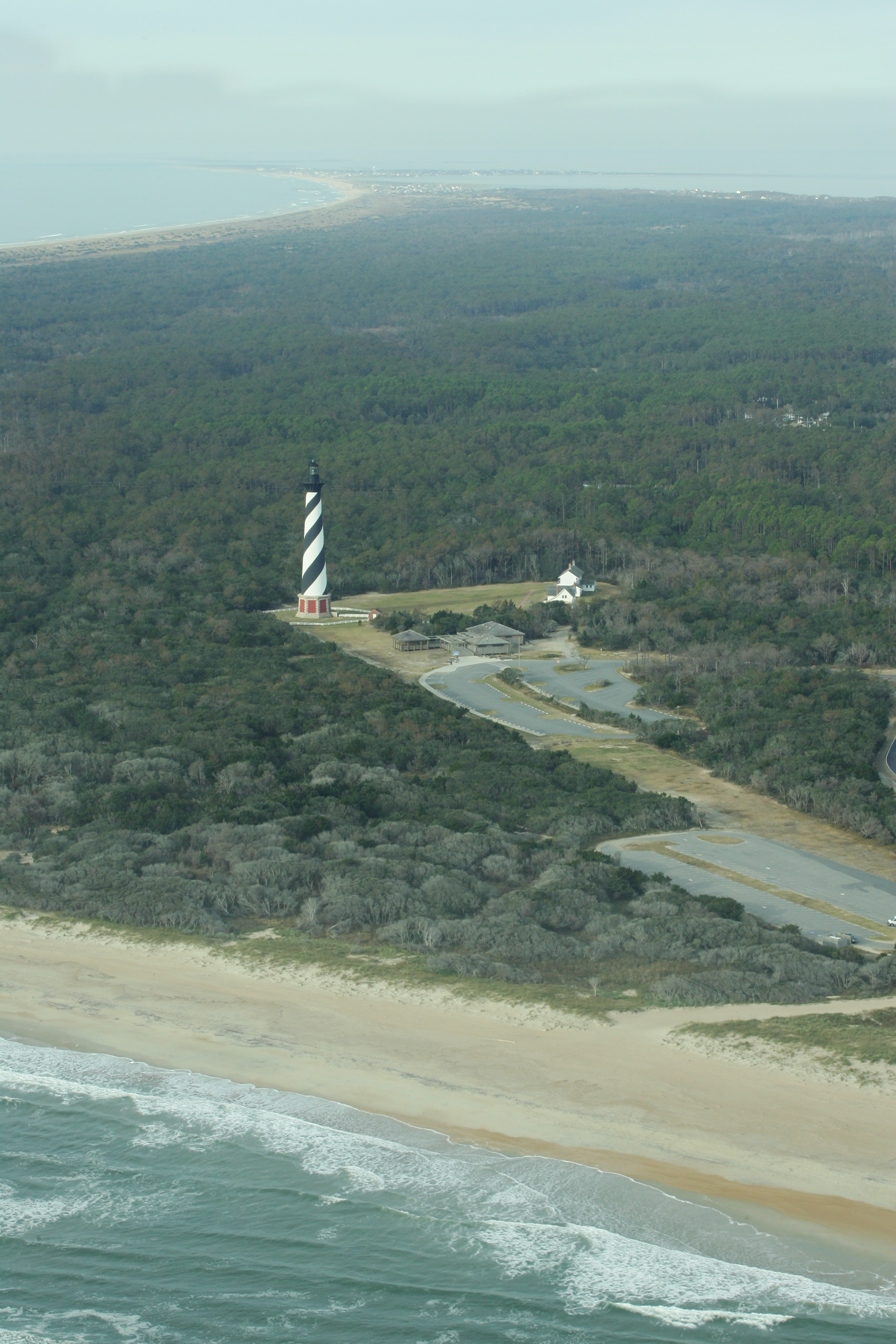
Cape Hatteras National Seashore

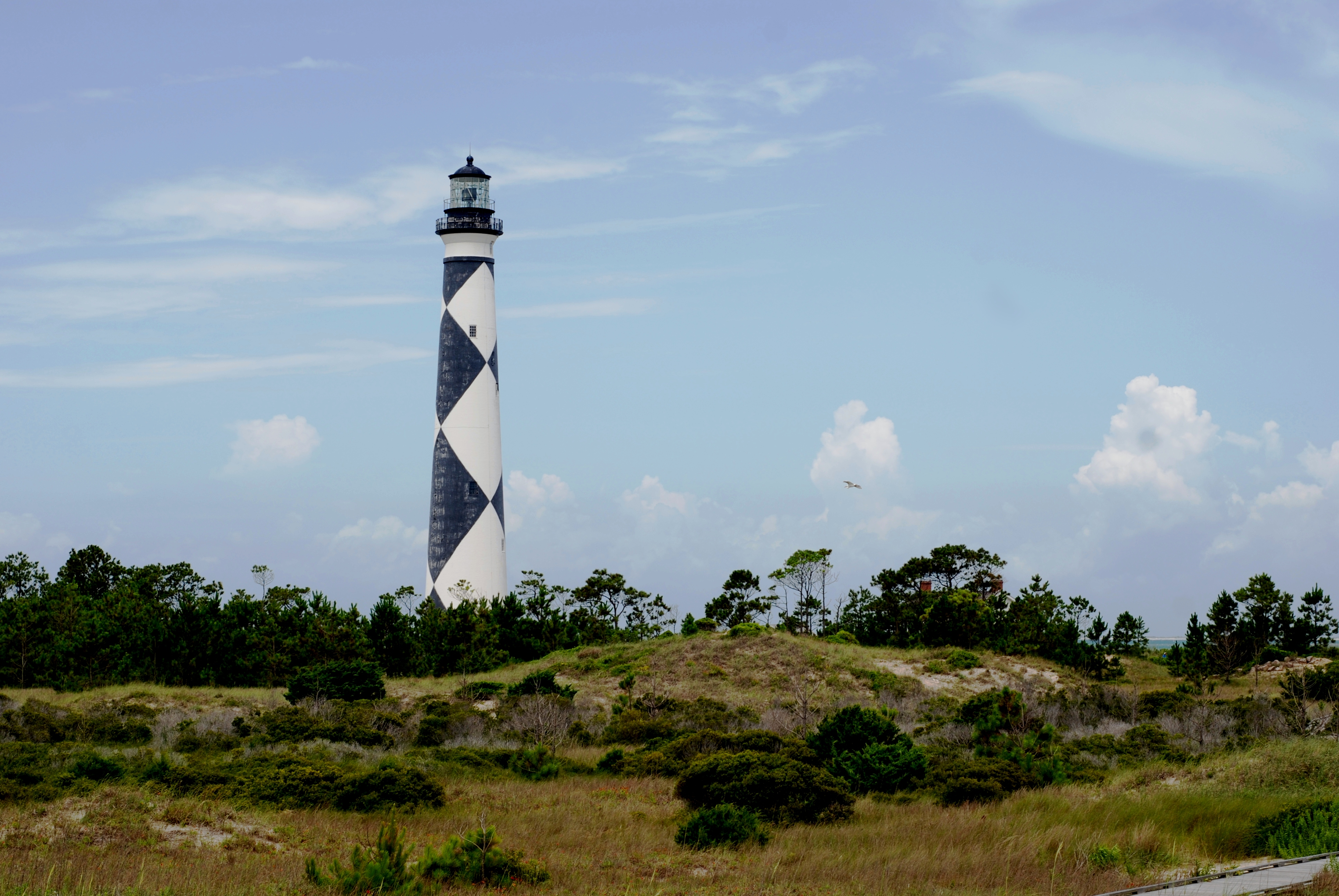
Cape Lookout Lighthouse

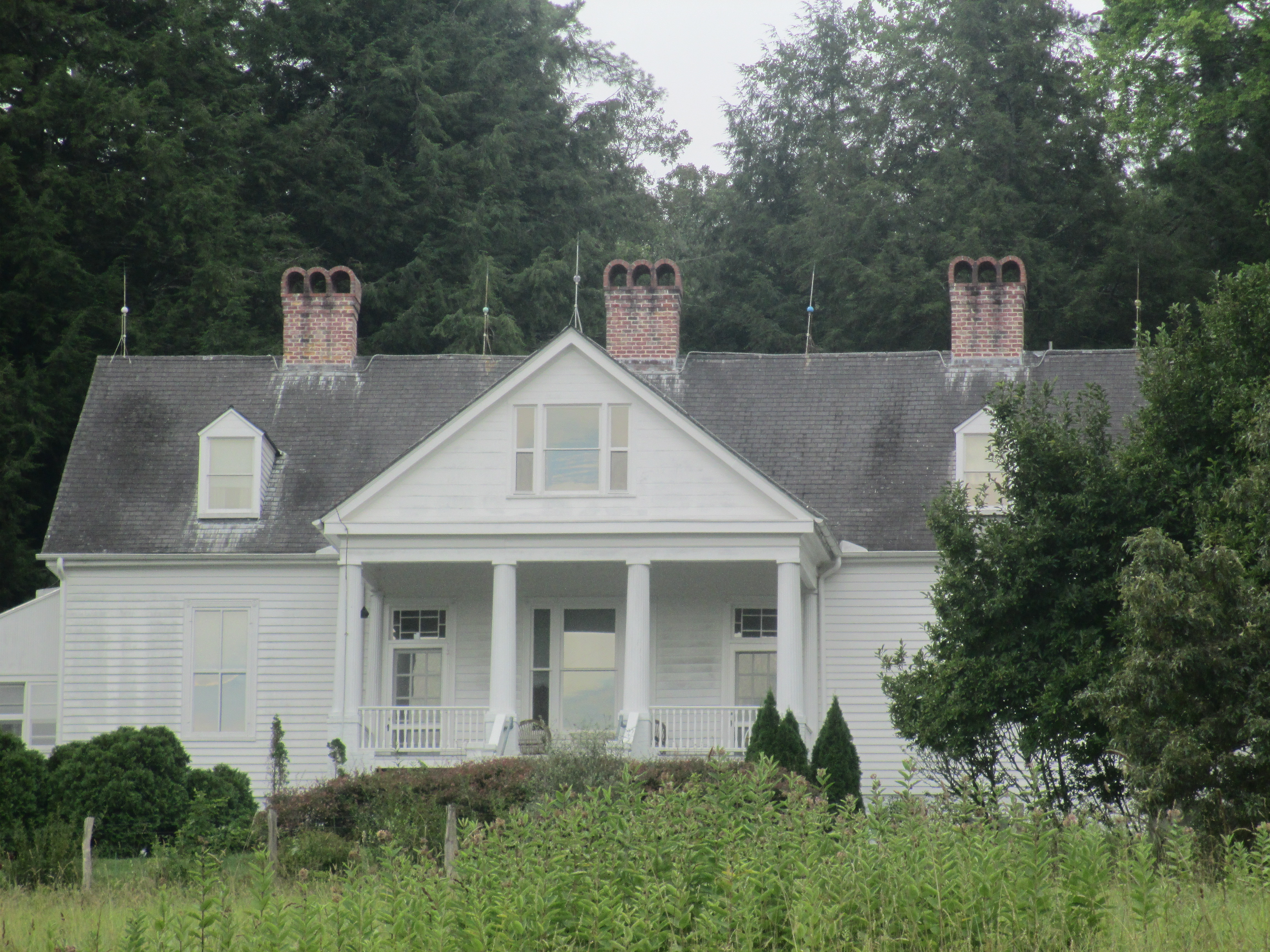
Carl Sandburg house

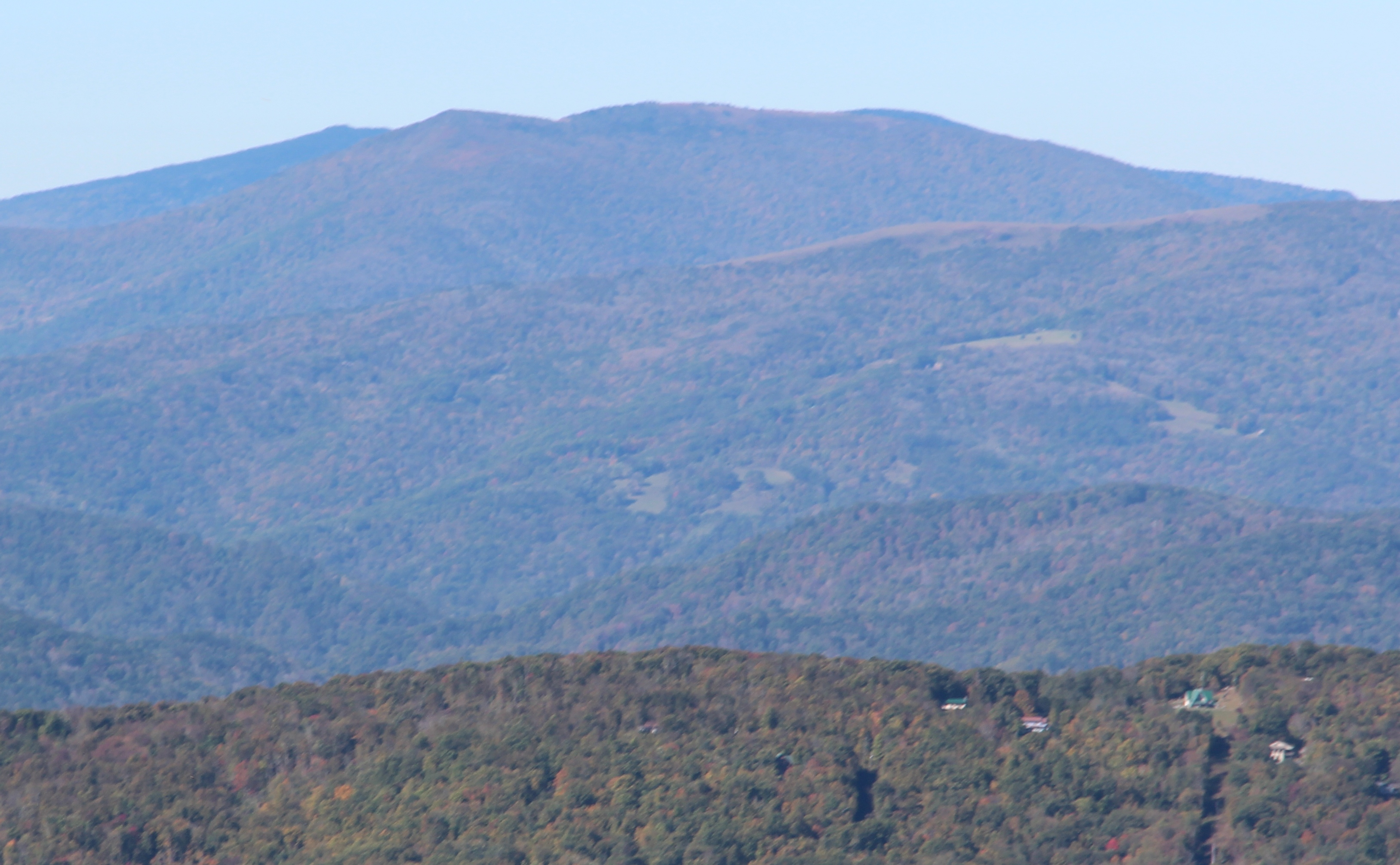
Overmountain Trail near Grassy Ridge Bald

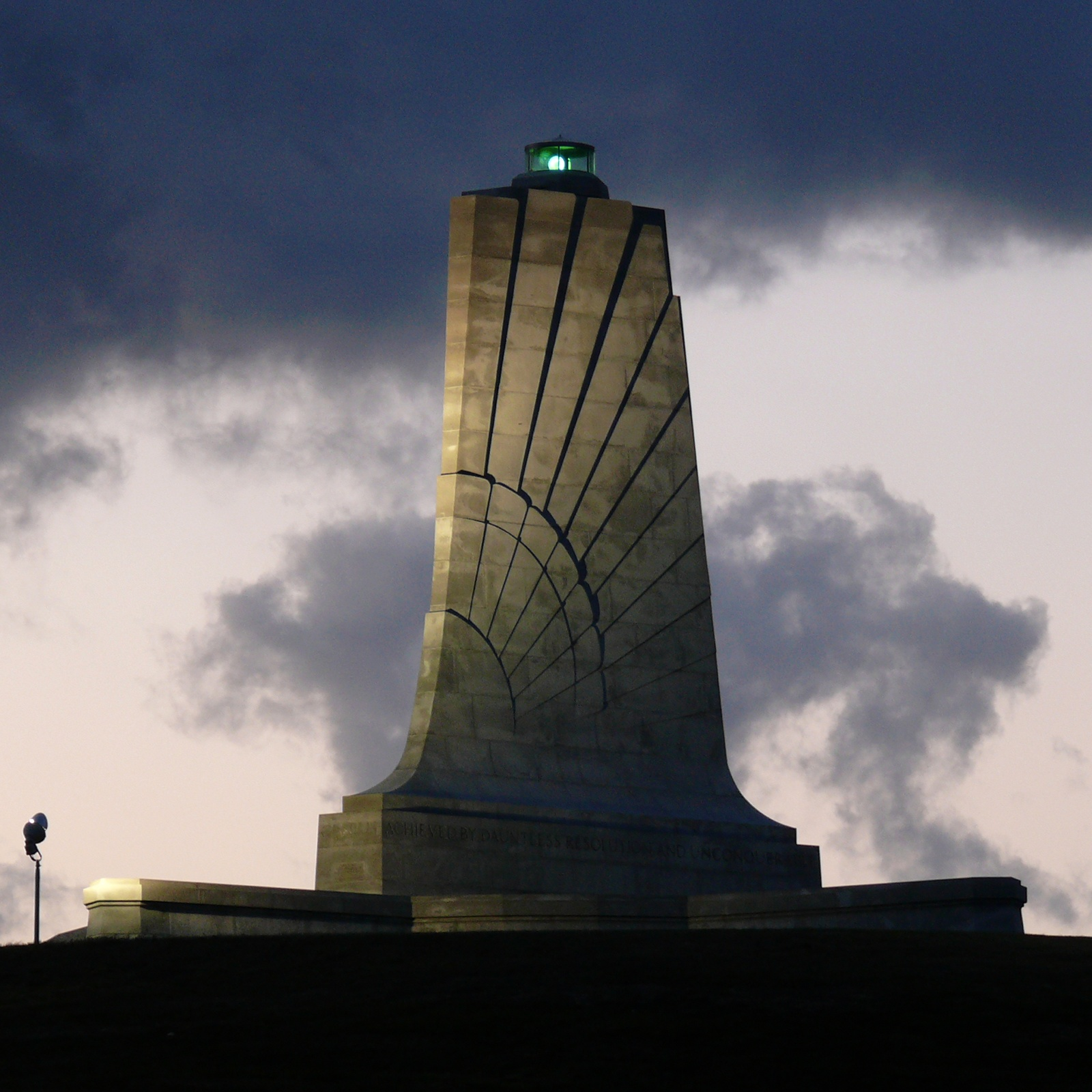
Wright Brothers Memorial

Park	Date Established as National Site	Coordinates
Appalachian Trail	1920s	35.035482°N 83.537977°W, 35°27′8″N 83°48′17″W
Blue Ridge Parkway	September 11, 1935	36°31′07″N 80°56′09″W
Blue Ridge National Heritage Area	November 20, 2003	35.565920°N 82.485834°W
Cape Hatteras National Seashore	August 17, 1937	35°18′13″N 75°30′41″W
Cape Lookout National Seashore	March 10, 1966	34°36′19″N 76°32′11″W
Carl Sandburg Home National Historic Site	October 17, 1968	35°16′4″N 82°27′6″W
Fort Raleigh National Historic Site	April 5, 1941	35°56′18″N 75°42′32″W
Great Smoky Mountains National Park	June 15, 1934	35°36′N 83°31′W
Guilford Courthouse National Military Park	March 2, 1917	36°7′53″N 79°50′47″W
Gullah/Geechee Cultural Heritage Corridor	October 12, 2006	coast of North Carolina
Moores Creek National Battlefield	October 15, 1966	34°27′29″N 78°06′34″W
Overmountain Victory National Historic Trail	September 1980	36.348720°N 82.210688°W
Trail of Tears National Historic Trail	1987	35°58′7″N 83°36′15″W
Wright Brothers National Memorial	March 2, 1927	36.0143°N 75.6679°W

See also List of National Natural Landmarks in North Carolina
