= Solar power in North Carolina =

The economic viability of solar energy is heavily influenced by political and technological factors. Political dynamics play a critical role in shaping renewable energy policy, with barriers such as political polarization and protection of incumbent industries often hindering the adoption of solar power. Long-term analyses of U.S. policies demonstrate how favorable regulations can accelerate solar adoption, a consideration particularly relevant to North Carolina. With its abundant agricultural land, and its relative political power as a swing state, the state has been identified as having significant potential for further solar energy expansion, supported by policy measures and technological advancements .

In addition to federal incentives, the state has a renewable portfolio standard of 12.5% by 2021 and a state renewable energy tax credit, both of which have been credited with boosting solar installations. In June 2023, the Environmental Protection Agency released $7 billion for solar for all notice. This is a program that aims to expand solar to disadvantaged communities.

In North Carolina, the distribution of solar power production is mainly on land that is classified as agricultural land, at 63%. In North Carolina there exists potential growth for solar energy on this agricultural land. Specifically, land that has watersheds adjacent to the land. Furthermore, a 2018 Smithsonian Magazine article described North Carolina as likely being the national leader in the "solar shepherd phenomenon" – combining sheep farming with solar power plants to reduce the high costs of grass trimming. A drawback of distributing solar power on agricultural land is the land that can potentially be lost for crops. There are debates of whether solar will harm agriculture.

Duke Energy is a large energy providing company. They have been playing a role in implementing solar in North Carolina, making it second in the nation for most solar energy usage. In 2017, they helped develop laws that allowed the implementation of solar and made it more affordable.

According to a report from the Solar Energy Industries Association, as of June 2019, North Carolina generates 5.81% of its electricity through solar power, and ranks second (up from third in 2018) in total installed photovoltaics. As of 2023 this number is up to 9.33% being ranked 4th.

== Currently operating (Note: As of December 31, 2025) ==
=== Coastal Plain Region ===
Solar Facilities in North Carolina (Coastal Plain Region)
#	Plant Name	Utility Name	County	Capacity (MW)	Operating Year
1	Butler-Warner Generation Plant	Fayetteville Public Works Commission	Cumberland	1.0	2019
2	SunEdison LV Sutton Plant Site	SunE NC Progress 1 LLC	New Hanover	1.0	2008
3	RMQ 1 and 2	RMQ Ventures LLC	Edgecombe	1.0	2008
4	RMQ 1 and 2	RMQ Ventures LLC	Edgecombe	2.5	2013
5	Shelby Solar Energy Generation Facility	Deriva Energy	Cleveland	0.9	2010
6	510 REPP One	510 REPP One LLC	Northampton	1.3	2014
7	Solar Star North Carolina II LLC	Deriva Energy	Hertford	1.3	2011
8	Solar Star North Carolina II LLC	Deriva Energy	Hertford	1.3	2011
9	Solar Star North Carolina II LLC	Deriva Energy	Hertford	1.3	2011
10	Solar Star North Carolina II LLC	Deriva Energy	Hertford	1.3	2011
11	Solar Star North Carolina II LLC	Deriva Energy	Hertford	1.3	2011
12	Washington White Post Solar LLC	Deriva Energy	Beaufort	12.4	2012
13	South Robeson Farm	USF Surry, LLC	Robeson	5.0	2012
14	Raeford Farm	SRE Utility Solar 1, LLC	Hoke	5.0	2012
15	Chadbourn Farm	Strata Manager, LLC	Columbus	5.0	2012
16	Belwood Farm	Palmetto Power Management LLC	Cleveland	4.0	2012
17	Railroad Farm	Headwater Energy, LLC	Robeson	5.0	2012
18	Watts Farm	Headwater Energy, LLC	Robeson	5.0	2012
19	Shannon Farm	Strata Manager, LLC	Robeson	5.0	2012
20	Lenoir Farm	Strata Manager, LLC	Lenoir	5.0	2013
21	Lenoir Farm 2	Strata Manager, LLC	Lenoir	5.0	2013
22	Moorings Farm	Strata Manager, LLC	Wayne	5.0	2013
23	New Bern Farm	Strata Manager, LLC	Craven	5.0	2014
24	Wilson Farm 1	Strata Manager, LLC	Wilson	5.0	2013
25	AM Best Farm	Strata Manager, LLC	Wayne	5.0	2013
26	Mt Olive Farm 2	Strata Manager, LLC	Wayne	5.0	2013
27	Rock Farm	Strata Manager, LLC	Richmond	5.0	2013
28	McCallum Farm	Strata Manager, LLC	Robeson	5.0	2013
29	Dixon Dairy Road Solar	Headwater Energy, LLC	Cleveland	4.0	2011
30	Plymouth Solar LLC	SunEnergy1	Washington	5.4	2012
31	Sandy Cross Solar, LLC	Oppidum Renewables USA, LLC	Nash	1.2	2012
32	Progress Solar II, LLC	Oppidum Renewables USA, LLC	Robeson	3.5	2012
33	Progress Solar III, LLC	Oppidum Renewables USA, LLC	Robeson	3.5	2012
34	Progress Manis I	USF Surry, LLC	Scotland	2.0	2012
35	North Carolina Solar Bethea I	USF Surry, LLC	Scotland	2.0	2013
36	Blueberry One	Cypress Creek Renewables	Wayne	5.0	2016
37	Holstein Plant	Strata Manager, LLC	Scotland	20.0	2015
38	Selma Solar LLC	AES Distributed Energy	Johnston	5.0	2014
39	Turkey Branch Solar LLC	AES Distributed Energy	Robeson	5.0	2014
40	Gates Solar LLC	Oppidum Renewables USA, LLC	Gates	5.0	2015
41	Chocowinity Solar LLC	Oppidum Renewables USA, LLC	Beaufort	5.0	2014
42	Audrey Solar	Audrey Solar LLC	Cleveland	3.0	2016
43	Sophie Solar	Sophie Solar LLC	Cleveland	4.5	2016
44	Sonne One	Cypress Creek Renewables	Wayne	5.0	2016
45	Kirkwall Holdings	Cypress Creek Renewables	Duplin	5.0	2016
46	Ayrshire	CD Global Solar Holdings, LLC	Cleveland	19.4	2017
47	Pamlico Partners Solar	Pamlico Partners Solar, LLC	Beaufort	5.0	2013
48	Arba Solar, LLC	Leyline Renewable Energy, LLC	Greene	0.5	2014
49	Arba Solar, LLC	Leyline Renewable Energy, LLC	Greene	0.5	2014
50	Arba Solar, LLC	Leyline Renewable Energy, LLC	Greene	0.5	2014
51	Arba Solar, LLC	Leyline Renewable Energy, LLC	Greene	0.5	2014
52	Kenansville Solar 2, LLC	Cypress Creek Renewables	Duplin	2.0	2016
53	Samarcand Solar Farm, LLC	SRE Utility Solar 1, LLC	Moore	0.5	2014
54	Samarcand Solar Farm, LLC	SRE Utility Solar 1, LLC	Moore	0.5	2014
55	Samarcand Solar Farm, LLC	SRE Utility Solar 1, LLC	Moore	0.5	2014
56	Samarcand Solar Farm, LLC	SRE Utility Solar 1, LLC	Moore	0.5	2014
57	Samarcand Solar Farm, LLC	SRE Utility Solar 1, LLC	Moore	0.5	2014
58	Samarcand Solar Farm, LLC	SRE Utility Solar 1, LLC	Moore	0.5	2014
59	Samarcand Solar Farm, LLC	SRE Utility Solar 1, LLC	Moore	0.5	2014
60	Samarcand Solar Farm, LLC	SRE Utility Solar 1, LLC	Moore	0.5	2014
61	Samarcand Solar Farm, LLC	SRE Utility Solar 1, LLC	Moore	0.5	2014
62	Samarcand Solar Farm, LLC	SRE Utility Solar 1, LLC	Moore	0.5	2014
63	Albemarle Solar Center LLC	SRE Utility Solar 1, LLC	Lenoir	5.0	2014
64	Boseman Solar Center LLC	Cypress Creek Renewables	Nash	5.0	2014
65	Flemming Solar Center LLC	Cypress Creek Renewables	Pitt	5.0	2014
66	Littlefield Solar Center LLC	SRE Utility Solar 1, LLC	Pitt	5.0	2015
67	Rams Horn Solar Center LLC	Cypress Creek Renewables	Pitt	5.0	2014
68	Upchurch Solar Center LLC	Cypress Creek Renewables	Wilson	5.0	2014
69	Kenansville Solar Farm, LLC	SRE Utility Solar 1, LLC	Duplin	0.5	2014
70	Kenansville Solar Farm, LLC	SRE Utility Solar 1, LLC	Duplin	0.5	2014
71	Kenansville Solar Farm, LLC	SRE Utility Solar 1, LLC	Duplin	0.5	2014
72	Kenansville Solar Farm, LLC	SRE Utility Solar 1, LLC	Duplin	0.5	2014
73	Kenansville Solar Farm, LLC	SRE Utility Solar 1, LLC	Duplin	0.5	2014
74	Kenansville Solar Farm, LLC	SRE Utility Solar 1, LLC	Duplin	0.5	2014
75	Kenansville Solar Farm, LLC	SRE Utility Solar 1, LLC	Duplin	0.5	2014
76	Kenansville Solar Farm, LLC	SRE Utility Solar 1, LLC	Duplin	0.5	2014
77	Kenansville Solar Farm, LLC	SRE Utility Solar 1, LLC	Duplin	0.5	2014
78	Bethel Price Solar, LLC	Deriva Energy	Pitt	5.0	2014
79	Dogwood Solar, LLC	Deriva Energy	Halifax	20.0	2014
80	Washington Airport Solar LLC	Deriva Energy	Beaufort	5.0	2014
81	Washington Millfield Solar, LLC	Deriva Energy	Beaufort	5.0	2013
82	Windsor Cooper HIill Solar, LLC	Deriva Energy	Bertie	5.0	2015
83	Warsaw Farm	Duke Energy Progress - (NC)	Duplin	65.0	2015
84	Castalia Solar	Strata Manager, LLC	Nash	2.0	2014
85	Oakboro Farm	Headwater Energy, LLC	Scotland	5.0	2014
86	McKenzie Farm	Strata Manager, LLC	Columbus	5.0	2013
87	Nash 58 Farm	Strata Manager, LLC	Nash	5.0	2013
88	Nash 64 Farm	Strata Manager, LLC	Nash	5.0	2014
89	Pate Farm	Strata Manager, LLC	Robeson	5.0	2013
90	Erwin Farm	Strata Manager, LLC	Harnett	5.0	2014
91	Waco Farm	Strata Manager, LLC	Cleveland	5.0	2013
92	Garrell Solar Farm	Strata Manager, LLC	Columbus	5.0	2013
93	Angier Farm	Strata Manager, LLC	Harnett	5.0	2013
94	Bladenboro Farm	Strata Manager, LLC	Bladen	5.0	2013
95	Duplin Solar LLC	SRE Utility Solar 1, LLC	Duplin	5.0	2013
96	North Carolina Solar III LLC	SRE Utility Solar 1, LLC	Scotland	4.9	2013
97	Halifax (NC)	Deriva Energy	Halifax	20.0	2014
98	Dessie Solar Center LLC	Dessie Solar Center LLC	Columbus	4.8	2014
99	Shankle Solar Center LLC	Shankle Solar Center LLC	Hoke	4.8	2015
100	Graham Solar Center LLC	Graham Solar Center LLC	Columbus	4.8	2014
101	Battleground	AES Distributed Energy	Cleveland	3.5	2013
102	Beulaville	AES Distributed Energy	Duplin	2.0	2013
103	Ellerbe	AES Distributed Energy	Richmond	2.0	2013
104	Wallace	AES Distributed Energy	Duplin	2.0	2013
105	Kenansville	AES Distributed Energy	Duplin	2.0	2013
106	Fairmont-FLS 100	AES Distributed Energy	Robeson	4.0	2013
107	Chauncey Farm LLC	Strata Manager, LLC	Columbus	4.9	2014
108	Fremont Farm LLC	Dominion Renewable Energy	Wayne	5.0	2017
109	Snow Hill Solar 2 LLC	Strata Manager, LLC	Greene	2.0	2014
110	Mount Olive Farm	Strata Manager, LLC	Wayne	5.0	2014
111	Spicewood Solar Farm LLC	Strata Manager, LLC	Moore	5.0	2014
112	Anderson Farm LLC	Strata Manager, LLC	Sampson	1.9	2014
113	DD Fayetteville Solar NC LLC	Duke Energy Progress - (NC)	Bladen	23.1	2015
114	Warsaw I	AES Distributed Energy	Duplin	2.0	2013
115	Warsaw II	AES Distributed Energy	Duplin	2.0	2013
116	Kinston	Strata Manager, LLC	Lenoir	2.0	2014
117	Bailey Farm LLC	Strata Manager, LLC	Nash	5.0	2013
118	Green Farm	Cypress Creek Renewables	Martin	5.0	2016
119	Simons Farm	Cypress Creek Renewables	Hertford	5.0	2016
120	Thornton PV1	Strata Manager, LLC	Greene	5.0	2015
121	Watson Seed Farm PV1	Strata Manager, LLC	Nash	20.0	2015
122	Bradley PV1	Strata Manager, LLC	Hertford	5.0	2015
123	Shawboro PV1	Deriva Energy	Currituck	20.0	2015
124	Carter PV1	Strata Manager, LLC	Cumberland	5.0	2014
125	Pecan PV1	Strata Manager, LLC	Richmond	5.0	2014
126	Langley PV1	Strata Manager, LLC	Wilson	5.0	2014
127	Highland Solar Center LLC	SRE Utility Solar 1, LLC	Lenoir	5.0	2015
128	Elm City Solar Facility	Duke Energy Progress - (NC)	Wilson	40.0	2016
129	Jakana Solar	Strata Manager, LLC	Martin	5.0	2014
130	Windsor Solar	Strata Manager, LLC	Bertie	5.0	2014
131	Bethel Solar	Strata Manager, LLC	Pitt	5.0	2015
132	Lewiston Solar	Strata Manager, LLC	Bertie	5.0	2014
133	Woodland Solar	Deriva Energy	Northampton	5.0	2016
134	Williamston Solar	Strata Manager, LLC	Martin	5.0	2014
135	Winton Solar	Deriva Energy	Hertford	5.0	2016
136	East Wayne Solar LLC	Strata Manager, LLC	Wayne	2.0	2014
137	Soluga Farms 1	Strata Manager, LLC	Sampson	5.0	2014
138	Soluga Farms 2 LLC	Strata Manager, LLC	Bladen	5.0	2014
139	Clipperton Holdings LLC	Dominion Renewable Energy	Sampson	5.0	2017
140	Faison Solar	USF Surry, LLC	Duplin	2.0	2015
141	Harrell's Hill Solar Center LLC	SRE Utility Solar 1, LLC	Wayne	5.0	2015
142	Rose Hill	Cypress Creek Renewables	Duplin	2.0	2012
143	Dunn	Cypress Creek Renewables	Harnett	2.0	2012
144	GKS Solar	Cypress Creek Renewables	Perquimans	5.0	2015
145	Two Mile Solar	Cypress Creek Renewables	Perquimans	5.0	2015
146	Downs Farm Solar	Cypress Creek Renewables	Hertford	5.0	2015
147	Lanier Solar	Cypress Creek Renewables	Duplin	4.9	2016
148	Highwater Solar I	Cypress Creek Renewables	Wayne	4.9	2015
149	Bearford Solar II	Bearford Solar II, LLC	Pender	4.9	2018
150	Andrew Solar	Cypress Creek Renewables	Craven	5.0	2015
151	Tracy Solar	Cypress Creek Renewables	Nash	10.0	2015
152	Candace Solar	Cypress Creek Renewables	Johnston	5.0	2016
153	Nitro Solar	USF Surry, LLC	Johnston	5.0	2015
154	Porter Solar	Cypress Creek Renewables	Craven	5.0	2015
155	Quincy Solar (NC)	Cypress Creek Renewables	Cumberland	4.0	2015
156	Chei Solar	Cypress Creek Renewables	Nash	5.0	2016
157	Murdock Solar	Cypress Creek Renewables	Johnston	4.0	2016
158	Beetle Solar	Cypress Creek Renewables	Cleveland	4.0	2016
159	Happy Solar	Cypress Creek Renewables	Johnston	4.0	2016
160	Meadows PV 1	Fresh Air Energy XVIII, LLC	Martin	20.0	2016
161	Flat Meeks PV 1	Strata Manager, LLC	Martin	5.0	2017
162	Benthall Bridge PV 1	Strata Manager, LLC	Hertford	5.0	2016
163	American Legion PV 1	Strata Manager, LLC	Halifax	16.0	2017
164	Baker PV 1	Strata Manager, LLC	Hertford	5.0	2016
165	Grandy PV 1	Strata Manager, LLC	Currituck	20.0	2020
166	Whitakers	Deriva Energy	Nash	12.0	2015
167	Kelford (Duke)	Deriva Energy	Bertie	20.0	2015
168	Pasquotank	Deriva Energy	Pasquotank	20.0	2014
169	Princeton	USF Surry, LLC	Johnston	5.0	2015
170	4Oaks	USF Surry, LLC	Johnston	5.0	2015
171	Creswell Alligood Solar, LLC	Deriva Energy	Washington	14.0	2015
172	Everetts Wildcat Solar, LLC	Deriva Energy	Martin	5.0	2015
173	FLS Solar 200, LLC	AES Distributed Energy	Robeson	4.3	2014
174	FLS Solar 170, LLC	AES Distributed Energy	Robeson	2.0	2014
175	Crockett Farm	Strata Manager, LLC	Lenoir	5.0	2014
176	Eastover Farm	Strata Manager, LLC	Scotland	5.0	2014
177	Foxfire Solar Farm	Strata Manager, LLC	Moore	5.0	2015
178	Hutchinson Farm	Strata Manager, LLC	Cleveland	5.0	2014
179	Keen Farm	Strata Manager, LLC	Johnston	5.0	2015
180	Bearford Farm Solar Project	Strata Manager, LLC	Pender	5.0	2017
181	Manway Solar Farm	Strata Manager, LLC	Bladen	5.0	2015
182	Tart Farm	Strata Manager, LLC	Cumberland	5.0	2016
183	Wellons Farm	Wellons Farm, LLC	Johnston	5.0	2015
184	Woodland Church Farm	Strata Manager, LLC	Duplin	5.0	2015
185	Schell Solar Farm	Heelstone Energy Holdings, LLC	Northampton	5.0	2016
186	Sedberry Farm	Heelstone Energy Holdings, LLC	Moore	5.0	2016
187	Walters Solar (FLS 260)	Cypress Creek Renewables	Robeson	5.0	2015
188	Garysburg Solar	Deriva Energy	Northampton	5.0	2016
189	Gaston Solar	Deriva Energy	Northampton	5.0	2016
190	Seaboard Solar LLC	Deriva Energy	Northampton	5.0	2016
191	Mt Olive Solar 1	Cypress Creek Renewables	Wayne	5.0	2015
192	FLS Solar 230 (Warren)	Cypress Creek Renewables	Duplin	4.8	2015
193	Tarboro Solar	Deriva Energy	Edgecombe	5.0	2016
194	Innovative Solar 47	MN8 Energy LLC	Robeson	33.8	2017
195	Innovative Solar 48	Cypress Creek Renewables	Robeson	4.9	2015
196	Innovative Solar 54	John Laing US Solar Corp.	Lenoir	50.0	2018
197	Innovative Solar 23	SRE Utility Solar 1, LLC	Cleveland	1.9	2015
198	Innovative Solar 46	Cypress Creek Renewables	Cumberland	78.5	2016
199	Innovative Solar 44	Cypress Creek Renewables	Robeson	4.9	2015
200	Innovative Solar 55	Cypress Creek Renewables	Robeson	6.5	2017
201	Innovative Solar 64	Cypress Creek Renewables	Sampson	4.9	2016
202	Innovative Solar 67	John Laing US Solar Corp.	Pender	33.3	2018
203	Aspen Solar, LLC	SRE Utility Solar 1, LLC	Duplin	5.0	2015
204	Van Slyke Solar Center, LLC	SRE Utility Solar 1, LLC	Wilson	5.0	2014
205	Broadway Solar Center, LLC	SRE Utility Solar 1, LLC	Columbus	5.0	2014
206	Eden Solar LLC	AES Distributed Energy	Richmond	47.7	2015
207	Ahoskie	Altus Power America Management, LLC	Hertford	5.0	2018
208	Kelford (Cypress)	Cypress Creek Renewables	Bertie	5.0	2016
209	Sweetgum Solar	SRE Utility Solar 1, LLC	Lee	5.0	2015
210	Balsam	SRE Utility Solar 1, LLC	Lee	5.0	2015
211	Hickory	Current Energy Group	Duplin	5.0	2019
212	Royal Solar	Cypress Creek Renewables	Cumberland	4.9	2015
213	Kinston Solar	Cypress Creek Renewables	Lenoir	5.0	2015
214	Laurinburg Solar	Cypress Creek Renewables	Scotland	5.0	2015
215	Newton Grove	SRE Utility Solar 1, LLC	Sampson	1.9	2015
216	SoINCPower6, LLC	Deriva Energy	Gates	5.0	2015
217	SoINCPower5, LLC	Deriva Energy	Nash	5.0	2015
218	Beaufort Solar, LLC	Capital Power Corporation	Beaufort	15.0	2015
219	SunEnergy1-Scotland Neck, LLC	SunEnergy1-Scotland Neck, LLC	Halifax	3.0	2014
220	Choco Solar, LLC	Choco Solar LLC	Beaufort	5.0	2014
221	Albertson Solar LLC	Albertson Solar LLC	Duplin	5.0	2015
222	Mount Olive Solar	AES Distributed Energy	Wayne	2.0	2016
223	Pollocksville Solar	Cypress Creek Renewables	Jones	5.0	2016
224	Lillington Solar	Altus Power America Management, LLC	Harnett	5.0	2017
225	Soluga Farms IV	SunStrong Management	Cumberland	3.4	2018
226	Coats Solar Farm, LLC	Cypress Creek Renewables	Harnett	5.0	2016
227	Conetoe II Solar, LLC	Deriva Energy	Edgecombe	80.0	2015
228	ESA Smithfield	SRE Utility Solar 1, LLC	Johnston	1.8	2015
229	ESA Selma	SRE Utility Solar 1, LLC	Johnston	1.8	2015
230	Camp Lejeune Solar and Energy Storage	Duke Energy Progress - (NC)	Onslow	12.8	2015
231	Boykin PV1	Strata Manager, LLC	Cumberland	16.0	2020
232	Turkey Creek PV1	Fresh Air Energy XXXV, LLC	Northampton	13.5	2017
233	Vaughn Creek PV1	Strata Manager, LLC	Hertford	20.0	2017
234	McLean Homestead	SolRiver Capital LLC	Scotland	4.9	2023
235	Pecan Solar	Dominion Renewable Energy	Northampton	74.9	2018
236	TWE Chocowinity Solar, LLC	Cypress Creek Renewables	Beaufort	4.5	2015
237	Innovative Solar 63, LLC	Cypress Creek Renewables	Greene	4.9	2016
238	Neisler Street Solar	Neisler Street Solar I, LLC	Cleveland	2.0	2015
239	Shelby Randolph Road Solar 1, LLC	SRE Utility Solar 1, LLC	Cleveland	2.0	2015
240	Lafayette Solar I, LLC	SRE Utility Solar 1, LLC	Cleveland	2.0	2015
241	Rockingham Solar, LLC	SRE Utility Solar 1, LLC	Richmond	5.0	2015
242	York Road Solar I, LLC	SRE Utility Solar 1, LLC	Cleveland	2.0	2015
243	SID Solar I, LLC	SRE Utility Solar 1, LLC	Cleveland	5.0	2015
244	HCE Johnston I, LLC	HCE Johnston I, LLC	Johnston	1.9	2015
245	Red Toad 1425 A Powatan Road, LLC	SRE Utility Solar 1, LLC	Johnston	2.0	2015
246	Nashville Farms, LLC	SRE Utility Solar 1, LLC	Nash	2.0	2015
247	Cedar Solar, LLC	SRE Utility Solar 1, LLC	Duplin	5.0	2015
248	Elm Solar, LLC	SRE Utility Solar 1, LLC	Lee	5.0	2015
249	Baltimore Church Solar, LLC	Altus Power America Management, LLC	Robeson	5.4	2017
250	Cohen Farm Solar, LLC	Cypress Creek Renewables	Lee	4.9	2016
251	Floyd Solar, LLC	Cypress Creek Renewables	Robeson	6.5	2016
252	Innovative Solar 43, LLC	Cypress Creek Renewables	Bladen	50.8	2016
253	Shelter Solar	Sol Systems	Hoke	5.0	2018
254	Heedeh Solar	MN8 Energy LLC	Columbus	4.5	2018
255	Tate Solar	USF Essex Lessor, LLC	Nash	5.0	2020
256	Robin Solar	SunStrong Management	Wayne	3.8	2021
257	Cash Solar	SunStrong Management	Nash	5.0	2020
258	Daystar Solar	Altus Power America Management, LLC	Jones	5.0	2017
259	Grove Solar	Sol Systems	Craven	5.0	2019
260	Conetoe Solar	Conetoe Solar, LLC	Edgecombe	5.0	2015
261	Sugar Run Solar	Sugar Run Solar, LLC	Gates	5.0	2015
262	TWE New Bern Solar Project, LLC	Cypress Creek Renewables	Craven	4.0	2016
263	County Home Solar Center, LLC	Heelstone Energy Holdings, LLC	Cleveland	2.0	2016
264	Laurinburg Solar, LLC (Heelstone)	SRE Utility Solar 1, LLC	Robeson	2.0	2015
265	Hemlock Solar	Hemlock Solar LLC	Northampton	5.0	2017
266	Long Farm 46 Solar, LLC	Deriva Energy	Northampton	5.0	2016
267	HXNAir Solar One	HXNAir Solar One LLC	Halifax	5.0	2017
268	Willard Solar	USF Essex Lessor, LLC	Pender	5.0	2020
269	Ajax Solar	Cypress Creek Renewables	Robeson	5.0	2017
270	Jester Solar	Sol Systems	Wayne	5.0	2020
271	Pine Valley Solar Farm, LLC	SunStrong Management	Moore	5.0	2022
272	Augustus Farm, LLC	Strata Manager, LLC	Pitt	4.9	2015
273	White Farm Solar, LLC	Cypress Creek Renewables	Northampton	5.2	2016
274	Battleboro Farm	Oppidum Renewables USA, LLC	Nash	5.2	2016
275	Flint Hill Solar, LLC	Cypress Creek Renewables	Moore	5.2	2016
276	Shoe Creek Solar, LLC	Cypress Creek Renewables	Scotland	65.0	2017
277	Hertford Solar Farm	Deriva Energy	Perquimans	5.0	2016
278	Warbler Holdings	SolRiver Capital LLC	Cleveland	4.0	2021
279	Tamworth Holdings	RWE Clean Energy	Bladen	5.0	2019
280	MC1 Solar	MC1 Solar Farm, LLC	Martin	5.0	2016
281	St. Pauls Solar 1, LLC	Cypress Creek Renewables	Robeson	4.9	2017
282	Kennedy Solar, LLC	Cypress Creek Renewables	Duplin	4.9	2017
283	Innovative Solar 65	Cypress Creek Renewables	Scotland	4.9	2016
284	Exum Farm Solar, LLC	Cypress Creek Renewables	Lenoir	4.9	2016
285	Bizzell Church Solar 1, LLC	Cypress Creek Renewables	Johnston	5.2	2015
286	CB Bladen Solar, LLC	Cypress Creek Renewables	Bladen	5.2	2016
287	Nash 97 Solar, LLC	Cypress Creek Renewables	Nash	5.2	2016
288	Hardison Farm Solar, LLC	Cypress Creek Renewables	Martin	5.2	2016
289	Maxton Solar, LLC	Cypress Creek Renewables	Robeson	4.9	2016
290	Modlin Solar Farm	Cypress Creek Renewables	Martin	4.9	2016
291	Morgan's Corner	Dominion Renewable Energy	Pasquotank	20.0	2015
292	Whitakers Farm (Fisher Rd)	Strata Manager, LLC	Nash	3.4	2016
293	Sellers Farm Solar	Strata Manager, LLC	Richmond	5.0	2022
294	McGrigor Farm Solar	Carolina Solar Energy LLC	Sampson	5.0	2019
295	Williamston West Farm, LLC	Strata Manager, LLC	Martin	4.9	2016
296	River Road Solar, LLC	Deriva Energy	Hertford	5.0	2016
297	Two Mile Desert Project	Citizens Enterprises Corporation	Perquimans	16.2	2019
298	Langdon Solar Farm, LLC	Strata Manager, LLC	Johnston	5.0	2015
299	Innovative Solar 42	Novis Renewables, LLC	Bladen	71.0	2017
300	Innovative Solar 31	MN8 Energy LLC	Bladen	35.0	2017
301	ZV Solar 3, LLC	SRE Utility Solar 1, LLC	Robeson	5.0	2016
302	Kojak Farm	Strata Manager, LLC	Nash	5.0	2016
303	Soluga Farms III	Strata Manager, LLC	Cumberland	5.0	2015
304	Wayne Solar III LLC	Wayne Solar III, LLC	Wayne	5.0	2014
305	Wayne Solar II LLC	Wayne Solar II, LLC	Wayne	5.0	2014
306	Duplin Solar I LLC (160 Houston Lane)	Duplin Solar I, LLC	Duplin	5.0	2014
307	Bay Branch Solar	Sol Systems	Beaufort	5.0	2018
308	Wayne Solar I LLC	Wayne Solar I, LLC	Wayne	5.0	2014
309	Summit Farms Solar	Dominion Renewable Energy	Currituck	62.4	2017
310	Brantley Solar	John Laing US Solar Corp.	Nash	50.2	2018
311	Gainey Solar, LLC	Cypress Creek Renewables	Bladen	2.0	2016
312	Bunn Level Farm, LLC	Strata Manager, LLC	Harnett	5.0	2016
313	Cork Oak Solar	Cork Oak Solar, LLC	Halifax	20.0	2017
314	Sunflower Solar	Sunflower Solar, LLC	Halifax	16.0	2017
315	North Nash Farm, LLC	Strata Manager, LLC	Nash	5.0	2015
316	Roper Farm, LLC	Strata Manager, LLC	Cleveland	5.0	2015
317	Hew Fulton Farm, LLC	Strata Manager, LLC	Scotland	5.0	2015
318	McGoogan Farm, LLC	Strata Manager, LLC	Robeson	5.0	2015
319	Barnhill Road Solar, LLC	Cypress Creek Renewables	Pasquotank	3.1	2016
320	Leggett Solar, LLC	Cypress Creek Renewables	Edgecombe	5.0	2016
321	Jersey Holdings	Heelstone Energy Holdings, LLC	Robeson	5.0	2017
322	Williamston Speight Solar, LLC	Williamston Speight Solar, LLC	Martin	15.0	2016
323	South Atlantic Services Solar Farm I	South Atlantic Services Inc	New Hanover	1.6	2013
324	Thigpen Farms Solar, LLC	Thigpen Solar, LLC	Robeson	5.0	2023
325	Carl Friedrich Gauss Solar	Heelstone Energy Holdings, LLC	Halifax	5.0	2018
326	Viper Solar	Cypress Creek Renewables	Cumberland	2.0	2017
327	Scarlet Solar	Cypress Creek Renewables	Lenoir	2.0	2017
328	Ruskin Solar	Cypress Creek Renewables	Wayne	2.0	2017
329	Red Oak Solar Farm, LLC	Heelstone Energy Holdings, LLC	Nash	5.0	2016
330	Cotten Farm, LLC	Heelstone Energy Holdings, LLC	Lee	5.0	2016
331	ZV Solar 1	Cypress Creek Renewables	Robeson	5.0	2016
332	Atkinson Farm Solar	Strata Manager, LLC	Duplin	5.0	2015
333	Northern Cardinal Solar	Terraform Arcadia	Halifax	2.0	2018
334	Everett PV1	Strata Manager, LLC	Martin	10.0	2019
335	Underwood PV2	Strata Manager, LLC	Hertford	16.0	2020
336	Chestnut Solar	Dominion Renewable Energy	Halifax	74.9	2020
337	Floyd Road Solar Farm	Altus Power America Management, LLC	Northampton	5.0	2017
338	Stone Solar	Strata Manager, LLC	Robeson	5.0	2016
339	Delco Farm	Strata Manager, LLC	Columbus	5.0	2016
340	Kinston Davis Farm	Strata Manager, LLC	Lenoir	5.0	2015
341	Laurinburg Farm	Strata Manager, LLC	Scotland	5.0	2015
342	Old Wire Farm	Strata Manager, LLC	Scotland	5.0	2016
343	Railroad Farm 2	Strata Manager, LLC	Robeson	5.0	2014
344	Sampson Solar	Strata Manager, LLC	Sampson	2.0	2015
345	Tolson Solar	Oppidum Renewables USA, LLC	Edgecombe	3.0	2015
346	Phelps 158 Solar Farm	CleanCapital Holdings	Northampton	5.0	2018
347	St. Pauls Solar 2	CD Global Solar Holdings, LLC	Robeson	5.0	2017
348	Boaz Farm Solar	CD Global Solar Holdings, LLC	Lee	5.0	2017
349	Bizzell Church Solar 2	CD Global Solar Holdings, LLC	Johnston	5.0	2017
350	Barker Solar, LLC	Altus Power America Management, LLC	Robeson	5.0	2017
351	231 Dixon 74 Solar I, LLC	Altus Power America Management, LLC	Cleveland	2.0	2017
352	Mill Pond Solar Farm, LLC	Altus Power America Management, LLC	Columbus	5.0	2017
353	Broadridge Solar, LLC	Altus Power America Management, LLC	Robeson	5.0	2017
354	Hood Farm Solar	CD Global Solar Holdings, LLC	Jones	4.9	2017
355	ZV Solar 2	CD Global Solar Holdings, LLC	Robeson	4.9	2017
356	Innovative Solar 35	CD Global Solar Holdings, LLC	Duplin	1.9	2017
357	Innovative Solar 59	CD Global Solar Holdings, LLC	Nash	1.9	2017
358	Innovative Solar 60	CD Global Solar Holdings, LLC	Nash	1.9	2017
359	Wilson Solar Farm 1	Headwater Energy, LLC	Wilson	3.4	2017
360	Wilson Solar Farm 2	Headwater Energy, LLC	Wilson	5.0	2017
361	Wilson Solar Farm 3	Headwater Energy, LLC	Wilson	10.0	2017
362	Wilson Solar Farm 4	Headwater Energy, LLC	Wilson	10.0	2017
363	Wilson Solar Farm 5	Headwater Energy, LLC	Wilson	10.0	2017
364	Wilson Solar Farm 6	Headwater Energy, LLC	Wilson	10.0	2017
365	Wilson Solar Farm 7	Headwater Energy, LLC	Wilson	10.0	2017
366	Bladenboro Solar, LLC	Cypress Creek Renewables	Bladen	4.8	2015
367	Lux Solar, LLC	Cypress Creek Renewables	Cleveland	2.0	2016
368	Sun Farm V, LLC	Greenbacker Renewable Energy Corporation	Perquimans	5.0	2018
369	Jackson Solar Farm	Headwater Energy, LLC	Wilson	10.0	2017
370	Long Henry Solar	Cypress Creek Renewables	Wayne	2.0	2017
371	Bondi Solar	Cypress Creek Renewables	Jones	5.0	2017
372	Deep Branch Farm	Strata Manager, LLC	Robeson	5.0	2017
373	Pikeville Farm	Dominion Renewable Energy	Wayne	5.0	2017
374	Moorings Farm 2, LLC	Dominion Renewable Energy	Lenoir	5.0	2017
375	Rosewood Solar	Cypress Creek Renewables	Wayne	2.0	2016
376	Bayboro Solar Farm	Cypress Creek Renewables	Pamlico	5.0	2017
377	Mustang Solar	Dominion Renewable Energy	Moore	5.0	2018
378	Bladen Solar	Cypress Creek Renewables	Bladen	50.0	2017
379	Davis Lane Solar, LLC	Heelstone Energy Holdings, LLC	Perquimans	5.0	2017
380	Cougar Solar, LLC	Cougar Solar, LLC	Lee	1.9	2017
381	Buckleberry Solar	John Laing US Solar Corp.	Lenoir	52.1	2018
382	North 301 Solar	North 301 Solar, LLC	Halifax	20.0	2019
383	Edenton Solar	Edenton Solar	Chowan	5.0	2019
384	Ranchland Solar, LLC	Ranchland Solar, LLC	Currituck	60.0	2017
385	Sun Farm VI, LLC	Greenbacker Renewable Energy Corporation	Perquimans	5.0	2018
386	Hanover Solar, LLC	MN8 Energy LLC	Jones	4.9	2018
387	Pinesage	Cypress Creek Renewables	Moore	5.0	2018
388	Page Solar	SunStrong Management	Johnston	1.6	2018
389	Alpha Value Solar	SunStrong Management	Perquimans	5.0	2019
390	Panda Solar NC 1, LLC	Panda Solar NC 1, LLC	Robeson	1.0	2019
391	Quarter Horse Solar	SunStrong Management	Pender	4.5	2018
392	Atkinson Solar II	SunStrong Management	Duplin	1.9	2018
393	Bladenboro Solar 2	SunStrong Management	Bladen	4.5	2018
394	Sadiebrook NC Solar	SunStrong Management	Bladen	5.0	2018
395	Lane Solar	SunStrong Management	Wayne	5.0	2018
396	Panda Solar NC 2, LLC	Panda Solar NC 2, LLC	Robeson	2.0	2019
397	Panda Solar NC 3, LLC	Panda Solar NC 3, LLC	Robeson	2.0	2019
398	Panda Solar NC 4, LLC	Panda Solar NC 4, LLC	Bladen	2.0	2019
399	Panda Solar NC 5, LLC	Panda Solar NC 5, LLC	Cumberland	1.0	2019
400	Panda Solar NC 6, LLC	Panda Solar NC 6, LLC	Columbus	1.0	2019
401	Panda Solar NC 7, LLC	Panda Solar NC 7 , LLC	Sampson	1.5	2019
402	Panda Solar NC 8, LLC	Panda Solar NC 8, LLC	Moore	2.0	2019
403	Panda Solar NC 9, LLC	Panda Solar NC 9, LLC	Cumberland	2.0	2019
404	Panda Solar NC 10, LLC	Panda Solar NC 10, LLC	Cumberland	2.0	2019
405	Panda Solar NC 11, LLC	Panda Solar NC 11, LLC	Cumberland	2.0	2019
406	Red Toad 4451 Buffalo Road, LLC	Sol Systems	Johnston	2.0	2018
407	Arthur Solar, LLC	MN8 Energy LLC	Columbus	5.0	2018
408	County Home Solar LLC	MN8 Energy LLC	Richmond	4.9	2018
409	Church Road Solar LLC	MN8 Energy LLC	Harnett	5.0	2018
410	Red Toad 5840 Buffalo Road, LLC	Sol Systems	Johnston	2.0	2018
411	Nickelson Solar, LLC	Sol Systems	Duplin	5.3	2018
412	Warren Solar Farm LLC	Sol Systems	Sampson	5.0	2019
413	Burgaw Solar, LLC	CI-II Mitchell Holding LLC	Pender	5.0	2019
414	Mill Pond Solar, LLC	Altus Power America Management, LLC	Martin	5.0	2019
415	Jamesville Road Solar, LLC	Altus Power America Management, LLC	Martin	5.0	2019
416	Camden Dam Solar, LLC	Altus Power America Management, LLC	Camden	5.0	2019
417	Aulander Holloman Solar, LLC	Aulander Holloman Solar, LLC	Hertford	99.0	2018
418	Flowers Solar LLC	Altus Power America Management, LLC	Johnston	4.3	2019
419	HCE Moore I	SunStrong Management	Moore	2.0	2018
420	Three Bridge	SunStrong Management	Robeson	2.0	2018
421	Wilkinson Solar LLC	Dominion Renewable Energy	Beaufort	80.6	2019
422	Wendell Solar Farm LLC	Sol Systems	Johnston	5.0	2019
423	Sabattus Solar LLC	Sol Systems	Nash	5.0	2019
424	Cookstown	Strata Manager, LLC	Wayne	5.0	2019
425	Starr	Strata Manager, LLC	Sampson	5.0	2019
426	Badger	Strata Manager, LLC	Jones	5.0	2019
427	Pecan Grove Solar, LLC	CI-II Mitchell Holding LLC	Craven	5.0	2019
428	1025 Traveller Solar, LLC	CI-II Mitchell Holding LLC	Lee	5.0	2019
429	Ennis Solar, LLC	CI-II Mitchell Holding LLC	Harnett	5.0	2019
430	Crooked Run	Cubico USA, LLC	Pender	70.1	2019
431	Shiloh Hwy Solar	SunStrong Management	Camden	5.0	2017
432	Sandy Solar	SunStrong Management	Camden	5.0	2018
433	Chowan Jehu Solar	SunStrong Management	Chowan	5.0	2018
434	Thanksgiving Fire Solar Farm, LLC	Sol Systems	Johnston	2.0	2019
435	Fern Solar LLC	Fern Solar LLC	Edgecombe	100.0	2020
436	Broad River Solar, LLC	Deriva Energy	Cleveland	50.0	2021
437	ESA Four Oaks 2 NC LLC	SunStrong Management	Johnston	2.0	2019
438	Spring Hope Solar 3, LLC	SunStrong Management	Nash	5.0	2020
439	Plott Hound Solar	Plott Hound Solar, LLC	Craven	5.0	2021
440	Hertford Solar Power, LLC	Capital V LLC	Hertford	10.0	2022
441	Gutenberg Solar	Dominion Energy Inc.	Northampton	79.9	2019
442	AGA TAG Solar IV LLC	AGA TAG Solar IV LLC	Brunswick	4.9	2019
443	Penny Hill Solar	Cardinal Renewables	Pitt	2.0	2017
444	Meeks Solar, LLC	Cardinal Renewables	Martin	2.0	2017
445	Cottonwood Solar, LLC	Cardinal Renewables	Northampton	3.0	2018
446	232 Long Branch 29 Solar I, LLC	Cardinal Renewables	Cleveland	2.0	2018
447	Harvest Beulaville, LLC	Cardinal Renewables	Duplin	2.0	2017
448	Aulander Hwy 42 Solar, LLC	Cardinal Renewables	Hertford	5.0	2016
449	Scotch Bonnet Solar, LLC	SunStrong Management	Pender	4.5	2020
450	Cubera Solar, LLC	SunStrong Management	Harnett	2.0	2020
451	ESA Hamlet NC , LLC	SunStrong Management	Richmond	5.0	2021
452	Railroad Solar Farm, LLC	Cardinal Renewables	Robeson	4.1	2016
453	ATOOD Solar IV, LLC	Cardinal Renewables	Brunswick	5.0	2019
454	1073 Onslow Solar	1073 Onslow Solar, LLC	Onslow	4.7	2021
455	Lang Solar Farm	Lang Solar Farm, LLC	Lenoir	5.0	2016
456	HWY 158 PV	Strata Manager, LLC	Hertford	9.0	2020
457	PG Solar, LLC	North Carolina El Member Corp	Duplin	2.0	2020
458	Freight Line Solar, LLC	North Carolina El Member Corp	Duplin	2.0	2020
459	Holly Swamp Solar, LLC	North Carolina El Member Corp	Robeson	2.0	2020
460	ESA Buies Creek, LLC	Sol Systems	Harnett	2.8	2020
461	Eros Solar, LLC	Sol Systems	Duplin	5.0	2020
462	Pleasant Hill PV1	Pine Gate Renewables	Northampton	20.0	2024
463	East Nash PV2	Pine Gate Renewables	Nash	23.4	2023
464	Benson Solar, LLC	USF Essex Lessor, LLC	Johnston	4.9	2020
465	Lane II Solar, LLC	USF Essex Lessor, LLC	Wayne	4.9	2020
466	Trent River Solar, LLC	SunStrong Management	Jones	78.7	2021
467	Harrison Solar, LLC	Harrison Solar, LLC	Sampson	5.0	2020
468	Bay Tree	Cypress Creek Renewables	Bladen	70.1	2021
469	315 Vinson Road	Red Toad 315 Vinson Road, LLC	Johnston	2.0	2020
470	Buttercup Solar, LLC	Sol Systems	Duplin	5.0	2020
471	Powatan Road Solar	Red Toad Powatan Phase 2 LLC	Johnston	2.0	2020
472	Fort Bragg - Camp Mackall PV BESS System	Ameresco Federal Solutions	Richmond	1.0	2023
473	Meadowlark Solar	Meadowlark Solar, LLC	Harnett	4.9	2018
474	Nash 97 Solar 2	Nash 97 Solar 2, LLC	Nash	4.9	2018
475	Nickelson Solar 2	Nickelson Solar 2, LLC	Duplin	4.9	2018
476	Harts Mill Solar, LLC	Harts Mills Solar, LLC	Edgecombe	80.0	2020
477	Albemarle Beach Solar	Albemarle Beach Solar, LLC	Washington	130.2	2020
478	Bo Biggs Solar	Bo Biggs Solar, LLC	Robeson	4.9	2018
479	Solar Lee, LLC	Solar Lee, LLC	Wayne	4.9	2021
480	Acme Solar, LLC	Acme Solar, LLC	Columbus	4.9	2021
481	Sweet Tea Solar, LLC	Sweet Tea Solar, LLC	Craven	4.5	2021
482	Sun Farm VIII, LLC	SunStrong Management	Nash	4.0	2020
483	Trojan Solar, LLC	Sol Systems	Columbus	5.0	2020
484	Gliden (Op Zone)	Greenbacker Renewable Energy Corporation	Chowan	5.0	2020
485	American Beech Solar LLC	MN8 Energy LLC	Halifax	140.0	2025
486	Grissom Solar, LLC	SunStrong Management	Halifax	5.0	2021
487	Swansboro Solar, LLC	Swansboro Solar, LLC	Onslow	4.9	2021
488	Suncaster, LLC	Suncaster, LLC	Wayne	2.4	2021
489	1034 Catherine Lake Solar, LLC	1034 Catherine Lake Solar, LLC	Onslow	4.9	2021
490	Hall Solar Energy Storage	North Carolina El Member Corp	Duplin	2.0	2022
491	South River H4 Solar Energy Storage	North Carolina El Member Corp	Sampson	0.5	2023
492	Arba Solar Energy Storage	North Carolina El Member Corp	Greene	5.0	2023
493	Rose Acre Solar Energy Storage	North Carolina El Member Corp	Hyde	2.0	2023
494	Hamlet Solar Energy Storage	North Carolina El Member Corp	Richmond	0.5	2023
495	Ludie Brown Solar Energy Storage	North Carolina El Member Corp	Duplin	2.0	2022
496	Camden Solar LLC	Camden Solar LLC	Camden	20.0	2021
497	Van Buren	Van Buren Solar, LLC	Sampson	2.0	2021
498	Ryland Road Solar	Altus Power America Management, LLC	Chowan	5.0	2021
499	Windsor Hwy 17 Solar	Altus Power America Management, LLC	Bertie	5.0	2021
500	Oak Trail Solar, LLC	Leeward Asset Management, LLC	Currituck	100.0	2023
501	Broadway Road Solar, LLC	SunStrong Management	Lee	2.0	2021
502	Wyse Fork Solar Farm, LLC	SunStrong Management	Jones	2.0	2021
503	Phobos Solar, LLC	Phobos Solar, LLC	Nash	78.8	2023
504	Cummins Whitakers PV Arrays	Cummins, Inc.	Nash	3.3	2022
505	Beaker	Strata Manager, LLC	Pitt	5.0	2019
506	Belafonte	Strata Manager, LLC	Duplin	3.4	2018
507	Gladstone Farm	Strata Manager, LLC	Moore	5.0	2019
508	Wedge	Strata Manager, LLC	Wayne	5.0	2021
509	Truman (NC)	Strata Manager, LLC	Johnston	5.0	2019
510	Trent River Farm	Strata Manager, LLC	Jones	5.0	2018
511	Sneads Grove	Strata Manager, LLC	Scotland	5.0	2018
512	Smith Solar Farm	Strata Manager, LLC	Scotland	5.0	2019
513	Richlands Solar, LLC	Richlands Solar, LLC	Onslow	1.9	2021
514	Cruise Solar, LLC	Cruise Solar, LLC	Onslow	1.9	2021
515	233 Randolph 74 Solar I, LLC	233 Randolph 74 Solar I, LLC	Cleveland	2.0	2022
516	Cathcart Solar, LLC	Cathcart Solar, LLC	Columbus	5.0	2023
517	Elk Solar LLC	SolRiver Capital LLC	Hoke	5.0	2024
518	Williams Solar LLC	SolRiver Capital LLC	Johnston	5.0	2025
519	Overhill Solar	Strata Manager, LLC	Sampson	5.0	2022
520	Polk Farm	Strata Manager, LLC	Richmond	5.0	2022
521	Shieldwall Solar	Strata Manager, LLC	Halifax	5.0	2022
522	Summit Solar	Strata Manager, LLC	Wayne	3.0	2022
523	Gray Fox Solar LLC	SolRiver Capital LLC	Robeson	5.0	2024
524	Spring Hope Solar 2, LLC	Spring Hope Solar 2, LLC	Nash	5.0	2021
525	Beckwith Solar	Beckwith Solar, LLC	Columbus	5.0	2022
526	Arthur 2 Solar	Arthur 2 Solar, LLC	Columbus	5.0	2023
527	Banner Solar	SunStrong Management	Johnston	5.0	2021
528	Brick City Solar	SunStrong Management	Duplin	5.0	2021
529	Clovelly Solar	SunStrong Management	Harnett	5.0	2021
530	Coogee Solar	SunStrong Management	Pamlico	5.0	2021
531	Millers Chapel Solar	SunStrong Management	Wayne	4.8	2021
532	Overman Solar	SunStrong Management	Wayne	5.0	2021
533	Mule Farm Solar, LLC	Headwater Energy, LLC	Johnston	2.0	2022
534	Ramp Solar, LLC	Headwater Energy, LLC	Wayne	2.0	2022
535	Hubble Solar, LLC	Headwater Energy, LLC	Columbus	2.0	2023
536	Henry Gibson Solar	Henry Gibson Solar, LLC	Scotland	5.0	2024
537	Harding Solar, LLC	SolRiver Capital LLC	Greene	3.0	2024
538	Oak Solar	Oak Solar LLC	Northampton	120.0	2023
539	Colice Hall Solar	Colice Hall Solar LLC	Hertford	17.0	2023
540	Red Bud Solar Plant	Duke Energy Carolinas, LLC	Nash	80.0	2025
541	Gillespie Street Solar	Fayetteville Public Works Commission	Cumberland	1.9	2025
542	Rockfish Solar	Fayetteville Public Works Commission	Cumberland	4.9	2025

=== Piedmont Region ===
Solar Facilities in North Carolina (Piedmont Region)
#	Plant Name	Utility Name	County	Capacity (MW)	Operating Year
1	SAS Solar Farm	SAS Institute Inc	Wake	0.5	2010
2	SAS Solar Farm	SAS Institute Inc	Wake	0.5	2010
3	Mayberry Solar LLC	Oppidum Renewables USA, LLC	Surry	1.2	2011
4	DE Solar 10240 Old Dowd Rd	Duke Energy Carolinas, LLC	Mecklenburg	1.9	2010
5	DE Solar 657 Brigham Rd	Duke Energy Carolinas, LLC	Guilford	1.3	2010
6	Taylorsville Solar LLC	Deriva Energy	Alexander	1.0	2010
7	Apple Data Center PV	Apple, Inc	Catawba	21.0	2013
8	PCIP Solar	CleanCapital Holdings	Person	1.0	2011
9	Warrenton Farm	Headwater Energy, LLC	Warren	4.0	2012
10	Mocksville Farm	Strata Manager, LLC	Davie	5.0	2012
11	Arndt Farm	Strata Manager, LLC	Catawba	5.0	2012
12	Farrington Farm	Strata Manager, LLC	Chatham	1.0	2012
13	Fuquay Farm	Strata Manager, LLC	Wake	5.0	2013
14	Haynes Farm	Strata Manager, LLC	Lincoln	5.0	2013
15	Marshville Farm	Strata Manager, LLC	Union	5.0	2013
16	Mile Farm	Palmetto Power Management LLC	Durham	5.0	2014
17	Moore Solar Farm	Strata Manager, LLC	Rockingham	5.0	2013
18	Roxboro Farm	Strata Manager, LLC	Person	5.0	2014
19	White Cross Farm	Strata Manager, LLC	Orange	5.0	2013
20	Yanceyville Farm	Headwater Energy, LLC	Caswell	5.0	2013
21	Dibrell Farm	Strata Manager, LLC	Rockingham	5.0	2013
22	Two Lines Farm	Strata Manager, LLC	Catawba	5.0	2013
23	Bolton Farm	Strata Manager, LLC	Warren	5.0	2013
24	Granville Solar PV Power Project	Southern Power Co	Granville	2.5	2012
25	Ararat Rock Solar, LLC	Oppidum Renewables USA, LLC	Surry	3.5	2012
26	Progress Solar 1, LLC	Oppidum Renewables USA, LLC	Franklin	4.0	2012
27	Neuse River Solar Farm	Scale Sustainable I, LLC	Wake	1.1	2011
28	PCSP3 Airport	Carolina Solar Energy LLC	Person	2.5	2011
29	Montgomery Solar LLC	Oppidum Renewables USA, LLC	Montgomery	20.0	2015
30	Biscoe Solar LLC	AES Distributed Energy	Montgomery	5.0	2014
31	Rockwell Solar LLC	Oppidum Renewables USA, LLC	Rowan	3.5	2014
32	Cirrus Solar LLC	Oppidum Renewables USA, LLC	Franklin	5.0	2014
33	Apple Data Center - PV2	Apple, Inc	Catawba	20.0	2013
34	Elliana Solar	Cypress Creek Renewables	Alamance	5.0	2015
35	Flash Solar	Cypress Creek Renewables	Catawba	5.0	2015
36	Angel Solar	Cypress Creek Renewables	Catawba	5.0	2015
37	Buddy Solar	Cypress Creek Renewables	Rowan	4.0	2015
38	Milo Solar	Milo Solar LLC	Alamance	3.0	2016
39	Minnie Solar	Minnie Solar LLC	Alamance	3.0	2016
40	Nick Solar	AES Distributed Energy	Guilford	5.0	2014
41	Owen Solar	Owen Solar LLC	Catawba	5.0	2016
42	Star Solar	Star Solar LLC	Durham	5.0	2016
43	Franklin Solar, LLC	Leyline Renewable Energy, LLC	Franklin	0.5	2013
44	Franklin Solar, LLC	Leyline Renewable Energy, LLC	Franklin	0.5	2013
45	Franklin Solar, LLC	Leyline Renewable Energy, LLC	Franklin	0.5	2013
46	Franklin Solar, LLC	Leyline Renewable Energy, LLC	Franklin	0.5	2013
47	Apple One	Cypress Creek Renewables	Catawba	5.0	2015
48	Sonne Two	Heelstone Energy Holdings, LLC	Catawba	5.0	2016
49	Sigmon Catawba Farm	Strata Manager, LLC	Catawba	5.0	2014
50	Wagstaff Farm 1	Strata Manager, LLC	Person	5.0	2013
51	Sunfish Farm	Cypress Creek Renewables	Wake	5.0	2015
52	Dement Farm LLC	SRE Utility Solar 1, LLC	Vance	5.0	2013
53	BearPond Solar Center LLC	BearPond Solar Center LLC	Vance	4.8	2014
54	Carol Jean Solar	Cypress Creek Renewables	Stokes	4.0	2016
55	Market Farm	Headwater Energy, LLC	Rockingham	4.9	2014
56	West Salisbury Farm LLC	Strata Manager, LLC	Rowan	5.0	2015
57	West Siler	Strata Manager, LLC	Chatham	5.0	2017
58	Yanceyville Farm 2 LLC	Strata Manager, LLC	Caswell	5.0	2015
59	Redmon Solar Farm LLC	Strata Manager, LLC	Rowan	2.0	2015
60	Moncure Farm LLC	Strata Manager, LLC	Chatham	3.0	2014
61	Martin Creek Farm LLC	Strata Manager, LLC	Vance	3.0	2014
62	Daniel Farm LLC	Strata Manager, LLC	Davie	5.0	2014
63	XPF Solar Field	United Therapeutics Corporation	Durham	3.0	2014
64	Mariposa Solar Center LLC	Heelstone Energy Holdings, LLC	Gaston	5.0	2016
65	Vickers	Strata Manager, LLC	Chatham	2.0	2014
66	Tiburon Holdings	Heelstone Energy Holdings, LLC	Davie	5.0	2016
67	South Cary WRF Solar Array	Town Of Cary - (NC)	Wake	1.5	2012
68	Facile Solar	Facile Solar LLC	Alamance	2.0	2015
69	CBC Solar Energy Gen Fac Phase 2	CBC Alternative Energy, LLC	Wake	2.5	2013
70	Apple Data Center PV3	Apple, Inc	Catawba	17.5	2015
71	Sarah Solar	USF Surry, LLC	Franklin	5.0	2015
72	Melinda Solar	Cypress Creek Renewables	Vance	5.0	2015
73	Jacob Solar	Cypress Creek Renewables	Rockingham	5.0	2016
74	Sun Devil Solar	Cypress Creek Renewables	Warren	5.0	2015
75	Kenneth Solar	Cypress Creek Renewables	Warren	3.0	2016
76	Husky Solar	Cypress Creek Renewables	Rockingham	5.0	2016
77	Old Catawba PV 1	Strata Manager, LLC	Catawba	3.5	2015
78	Manning PV 1	Strata Manager, LLC	Alamance	5.0	2018
79	Little River PV 1	Strata Manager, LLC	Randolph	5.0	2015
80	Ashley Solar Farm	Ashley Solar Farm, LLC	Yadkin	4.0	2015
81	Mocksville Solar	Duke Energy Carolinas, LLC	Davie	15.4	2016
82	Millikan Farm	Cypress Creek Renewables	Randolph	5.0	2015
83	Misenheimer Farm	Strata Manager, LLC	Stanly	5.0	2015
84	Monroe Moore Farm	Heelstone Energy Holdings, LLC	Union	5.0	2016
85	Franklin Solar 2	Strata Manager, LLC	Franklin	2.0	2014
86	Stout Farm	Strata Manager, LLC	Orange	5.0	2014
87	Yadkin 601 Farm	Yadkin 601 Farm, LLC	Yadkin	3.0	2015
88	Spring Valley Farm 2, LLC	Strata Manager, LLC	Vance	5.0	2017
89	Stikeleather Farm	Stikeleather Farm, LLC	Alexander	5.0	2015
90	Stagecoach Solar	Cypress Creek Renewables	Vance	5.0	2015
91	Vicksburg Solar	Cypress Creek Renewables	Vance	5.0	2015
92	Soul City Solar	Cypress Creek Renewables	Warren	3.5	2015
93	Cornwall Solar Center, LLC	SRE Utility Solar 1, LLC	Granville	5.0	2016
94	Innovative Solar 37 LLC	Dominion Renewable Energy	Anson	100.0	2017
95	BRE	SRE Utility Solar 1, LLC	Granville	5.0	2015
96	Franklinton Solar	Cypress Creek Renewables	Franklin	5.0	2017
97	Red Hill Solar Center, LLC	SRE Utility Solar 1, LLC	Warren	5.0	2014
98	Concord Farm	Shoe Show, Inc.	Cabarrus	4.5	2011
99	South Louisburg Solar	Cypress Creek Renewables	Franklin	5.0	2016
100	Freemont Solar Center LLC	Heelstone Energy Holdings, LLC	Lincoln	5.0	2016
101	Crestwood Solar Center LLC	SRE Utility Solar 1, LLC	Granville	5.0	2016
102	Vance Solar Farm, LLC	Cypress Creek Renewables	Vance	5.0	2016
103	BG Stewart Solar Farm, LLC	Cypress Creek Renewables	Union	5.0	2015
104	Meadowbrook Solar Farm	Cypress Creek Renewables	Rowan	5.0	2016
105	Yadkinville Solar	Oppidum Renewables USA, LLC	Yadkin	3.5	2015
106	Five Forks Solar	Five Forks Solar	Warren	20.0	2019
107	High Shoals PV1	SunStrong Management	Gaston	16.0	2022
108	Ouchchy PV1	Strata Manager, LLC	Orange	3.0	2015
109	Durham Solar	SRE Utility Solar 1, LLC	Durham	3.5	2015
110	Morgan Farm, LLC	SRE Utility Solar 1, LLC	Franklin	5.0	2015
111	Eagle Solar	USF Essex Lessor, LLC	Warren	4.0	2020
112	Kathleen Solar	Sol Systems	Wake	5.0	2018
113	Yanceyville Farm 3, LLC	Strata Manager, LLC	Caswell	4.9	2015
114	Stainback Solar Farm	Cypress Creek Renewables	Vance	5.0	2016
115	Organ Church Solar	MN8 Energy LLC	Rowan	5.0	2019
116	Trinity Solar	Trinity Solar, LLC	Randolph	5.0	2019
117	Howell Midland Farm, LLC	Strata Manager, LLC	Cabarrus	4.9	2015
118	Gastonia Solar Center	Adapture Renewables, Inc.	Gaston	4.3	2018
119	Wortham Solar Farm	Cypress Creek Renewables	Vance	5.0	2016
120	White Street Renewables	White Street Renewables LLC	Guilford	3.4	2020
121	Snow Camp Solar, LLC	Cypress Creek Renewables	Alamance	5.2	2016
122	Monroe Solar Facility	Duke Energy Carolinas, LLC	Union	54.6	2017
123	Currin Solar, LLC	Cypress Creek Renewables	Granville	5.2	2015
124	South Winston Farm, LLC	Cypress Creek Renewables	Forsyth	5.2	2016
125	Tides Lane Farm	Strata Manager, LLC	Franklin	3.7	2019
126	Germantown Solar, LLC	Cypress Creek Renewables	Forsyth	1.5	2015
127	Southerland Farm Solar	Strata Manager, LLC	Vance	5.0	2016
128	Wadesboro Farm 2	Strata Manager, LLC	Anson	5.0	2016
129	Wadesboro Farm 3	Strata Manager, LLC	Anson	5.0	2016
130	Hector Farm	Strata Manager, LLC	Montgomery	5.0	2017
131	Meriwether Farm	Strata Manager, LLC	Granville	5.0	2016
132	Old Pageland Monroe Road Solar Farm	Cypress Creek Renewables	Union	5.3	2015
133	Fox Creek Solar	John Laing US Solar Corp.	Franklin	50.2	2018
134	BRE NC Solar 3	SunStrong Management	Granville	5.0	2021
135	Perkins Solar, LLC	Cypress Creek Renewables	Person	2.0	2016
136	Auten Road Farm, LLC	Cypress Creek Renewables	Gaston	5.0	2017
137	Creech Solar 2, LLC	Cypress Creek Renewables	Wake	5.0	2016
138	Tanager Holdings	RWE Clean Energy	Randolph	5.0	2019
139	Catawba Solar LLC	Catawba Solar LLC	Rowan	2.0	2016
140	Washington Solar	SolRiver Capital LLC	Rockingham	5.0	2024
141	Violet Solar	Violet Solar, LLC	Cabarrus	5.0	2018
142	Siler 421 Farm, LLC	Heelstone Energy Holdings, LLC	Chatham	5.0	2016
143	Tripple State Farm	Strata Manager, LLC	Iredell	5.0	2016
144	Wadesboro Farm 1	Strata Manager, LLC	Anson	5.0	2015
145	Fisher Solar Farm - NC	Strata Manager, LLC	Stanly	5.0	2015
146	Mills Anson Farm	Strata Manager, LLC	Anson	5.0	2016
147	Salisbury Solar	Oppidum Renewables USA, LLC	Rowan	3.8	2018
148	Wadesboro Solar	Oppidum Renewables USA, LLC	Anson	5.0	2017
149	Century Drive Solar Farm	J.T. Hobby and Son, Inc.	Wake	1.0	2014
150	Kelly Solar, LLC	Altus Power America Management, LLC	Vance	5.0	2018
151	Spencer Farm, LLC	Strata Manager, LLC	Rowan	5.0	2017
152	Haywood Farm Solar	CD Global Solar Holdings, LLC	Montgomery	4.9	2017
153	Roxboro Solar Farm, LLC	Cypress Creek Renewables	Granville	5.0	2015
154	Bear Creek Solar (NC)	Cypress Creek Renewables	Chatham	2.0	2017
155	Bullock Solar, LLC	Cypress Creek Renewables	Vance	50.0	2017
156	ABD Farms	Cypress Creek Renewables	Randolph	5.0	2017
157	Bakatsias Solar	Cypress Creek Renewables	Alamance	5.0	2017
158	Statesville Solar	Cypress Creek Renewables	Rowan	5.0	2017
159	Wakefield Solar	Cypress Creek Renewables	Wake	5.0	2017
160	NC 102 Project LLC	NC 102 Project LLC	Cabarrus	74.8	2018
161	Morning View	Cypress Creek Renewables	Randolph	2.0	2018
162	Copperfield	Cypress Creek Renewables	Montgomery	2.0	2018
163	Hopewell Friends	Cypress Creek Renewables	Randolph	1.3	2018
164	Warrenton I Solar	SunStrong Management	Warren	4.9	2018
165	Woodleaf Solar Facility	Duke Energy Carolinas, LLC	Rowan	6.0	2018
166	Changeup	Strata Manager, LLC	Randolph	2.0	2019
167	Achilles Solar	Strata Manager, LLC	Montgomery	5.0	2019
168	Arborgate Solar	Strata Manager, LLC	Chatham	5.0	2019
169	Wadesboro 4	Strata Manager, LLC	Anson	2.2	2019
170	1047 Little Mountain Solar, LLC	CI-II Mitchell Holding LLC	Yadkin	3.0	2019
171	Maiden Creek Solar Power Plant	Duke Energy Carolinas, LLC	Catawba	69.3	2021
172	Gaston Solar Power Plant	Duke Energy Carolinas, LLC	Gaston	25.0	2020
173	Stony Knoll Solar, LLC	Deriva Energy	Surry	22.6	2022
174	Speedway Solar NC, LLC	Deriva Energy	Cabarrus	22.6	2021
175	Hawtree Solar	Hawtree Creek Farm Solar, LLC	Warren	65.0	2021
176	Carolina Lily Solar	Carolina Lily Solar, LLC	Davie	5.0	2021
177	Ray Wilson Solar	Ray Wilson Solar, LLC	Davie	5.0	2021
178	Strider Solar, LLC	Cardinal Renewables	Randolph	5.0	2018
179	Woodsdale Farm, LLC	Cardinal Renewables	Person	2.0	2018
180	1001 Ebenezer Church Solar	1001 Ebenezer Church Solar, LLC	Surry	5.0	2021
181	1009 Yadkin Solar	1009 Yadkin Solar, LLC	Yadkin	4.9	2021
182	1008 Matthews Solar	1008 Matthews Solar, LLC	Surry	4.9	2021
183	1045 Tomlin Mill Solar	1045 Tomlin Mill Solar, LLC	Iredell	4.9	2021
184	Ventura Solar, LLC	Sol Systems	Alexander	5.0	2020
185	Sugar Solar, LLC	SunStrong Management	Yadkin	60.0	2021
186	Lick Creek Solar, LLC	SunStrong Management	Stokes	50.0	2022
187	Highest Power Solar, LLC	SunStrong Management	Franklin	48.7	2022
188	Partin Solar	Partin Solar, LLC	Surry	50.0	2023
189	Pilot Mountain Solar, LLC	USF Essex Lessor, LLC	Stokes	4.9	2020
190	Hayes Solar, LLC	Hayes Solar, LLC	Surry	3.0	2020
191	Siler City Solar 2	Siler City Solar 2, LLC	Chatham	4.9	2018
192	Lotus	Cypress Creek Renewables	Guilford	4.0	2014
193	Big Boy	Cypress Creek Renewables	Guilford	3.0	2014
194	Beth	Cypress Creek Renewables	Guilford	5.0	2014
195	Charlie	Cypress Creek Renewables	Guilford	4.0	2014
196	Moore Solar	Moore Solar, LLC	Rockingham	5.0	2018
197	1051 Lucky Solar, LLC	1051 Lucky Solar, LLC	Yadkin	3.0	2021
198	ESA Boston Solar, LLC	Sol Systems	Person	5.0	2020
199	Zuma Solar, LLC	Sol Systems	Caswell	3.0	2020
200	Wake RJ3 Solar Energy Storage	North Carolina El Member Corp	Wake	0.5	2023
201	Lowe Solar Energy Storage	North Carolina El Member Corp	Randolph	2.0	2022
202	Spencer Meadow Solar Energy Storage	North Carolina El Member Corp	Randolph	2.0	2022
203	Old Cedar Solar Energy Storage	North Carolina El Member Corp	Randolph	1.0	2021
204	Flatwood Farm	Strata Manager, LLC	Chatham	5.0	2018
205	Stanly Solar, LLC	SunStrong Management	Stanly	50.0	2022
206	Cabin Creek Solar, LLC	Cabin Creek Solar, LLC	Montgomery	70.2	2023
207	Ridgeback	Ridgeback Solar, LLC	Randolph	2.0	2021
208	Thunderhead	Thunderhead Solar, LLC	Randolph	2.6	2021
209	Perendale Holdings, LLC	Perendale Holdings, LLC	Davie	7.5	2025
210	Gilead	Strata Manager, LLC	Montgomery	3.5	2019
211	Tinker (NC)	Strata Manager, LLC	Chatham	4.8	2018
212	Henry Farm	Strata Manager, LLC	Randolph	5.0	2017
213	Kalish Farm Solar	Strata Manager, LLC	Montgomery	5.0	2018
214	Kendall Farm	Strata Manager, LLC	Randolph	5.0	2019
215	Peake Road	Strata Manager, LLC	Granville	5.0	2019
216	Seagrove	Strata Manager, LLC	Randolph	4.5	2019
217	Misenheimer Solar LLC	Misenheimer Solar LLC	Stanly	74.4	2024
218	Longleaf Pine Solar LLC	SolRiver Capital LLC	Davie	5.0	2025
219	Virginia Line Solar, LLC	Virginia Line Solar, LLC	Warren	35.0	2023
220	Edison Farm	Strata Manager, LLC	Rockingham	2.0	2022
221	Selwyn Farm	Strata Manager, LLC	Anson	5.0	2022
222	Moyer Solar	Moyer Solar, LLC	Rockingham	5.0	2022
223	ESA Albemarle NC Solar	SunStrong Management	Stanly	2.0	2021
224	Oakwood Solar	SunStrong Management	Orange	5.0	2021
225	Saw Solar	SunStrong Management	Rowan	5.0	2022
226	Southwick Solar	SunStrong Management	Alamance	3.0	2020
227	Whiskey Solar	Whiskey Solar, LLC	Montgomery	5.0	2021
228	Davidson III	SunE B9 Holdings, LLC	Davidson	4.5	2010
229	Davidson IV	SunE B9 Holdings, LLC	Davidson	3.0	2010
230	Davidson V	SunE B9 Holdings, LLC	Davidson	1.5	2010
231	Baron Solar, LLC	Headwater Energy, LLC	Anson	5.0	2025

=== Mountains Region ===
Solar Facilities in North Carolina (Mountains Region)
#	Plant Name	Utility Name	County	Capacity (MW)	Operating Year
1	Martins Creek Solar NC, LLC	Deriva Energy	Cherokee	0.9	2011
2	Murphy Farm Power, LLC	Deriva Energy	Cherokee	0.9	2011
3	CS Murphy Point, LLC	Deriva Energy	Cherokee	0.9	2011
4	Charlotte Solar	Cypress Creek Renewables	Rutherford	5.0	2015
5	Amethyst Solar	Amethyst Solar LLC	Rutherford	3.0	2016
6	Dragstrip Farm	Strata Manager, LLC	Burke	5.0	2014
7	Innovative Solar 6	Cypress Creek Renewables	Buncombe	3.6	2016
8	Innovative Solar 14, LLC	AES Distributed Energy	Henderson	2.0	2014
9	Innovative Solar 15, LLC	AES Distributed Energy	Rutherford	2.0	2014
10	Rutherford Farm	Southern Power Co	Rutherford	74.8	2016
11	Cline Solar Farm, LLC	Cline Solar, LLC	Burke	5.0	2017
12	Innovative Solar 10	Cypress Creek Renewables	Haywood	1.5	2015
13	Innovative Solar 18, LLC	Cypress Creek Renewables	Rutherford	1.9	2015
14	Innovative Solar 26, LLC	Cypress Creek Renewables	Burke	1.9	2015
15	Innovative Solar 16	Cypress Creek Renewables	Henderson	2.0	2015
16	Lincoln Solar, LLC (NC)	Cypress Creek Renewables	Rutherford	4.9	2016
17	Bernhardt Furniture Solar Farm	Bernhardt Furniture Company	Caldwell	1.1	2015
18	Gamble Solar	Oppidum Renewables USA, LLC	Rutherford	3.0	2019
19	Biltmore Solar Fields	The Biltmore Company	Buncombe	1.5	2012
20	Old Caroleen Solar Farm	Cypress Creek Renewables	Rutherford	2.0	2018
21	Ruff Solar LLC	Sol Systems	Rutherford	22.0	2020
22	Hot Springs Energy Storage & Microgrid	Duke Energy Progress - (NC)	Madison	1.9	2022
23	Woodfin Solar	Duke Energy Progress - (NC)	Buncombe	5.0	2024
24	Brighter Future Solar	Brighter Future Solar LLC	Caldwell	11.0	2022
25	Clear Solar I, LLC	Clear Solar I, LLC	Rutherford	3.6	2020
26	Sawtell Solar	SunStrong Management	Henderson	3.0	2021

On September 15, 2014, Duke Energy committed US$500 million to an expansion of solar power in North Carolina. Announced projects include:

- Warsaw Solar Facility (65 MW) – Duplin County, developed by Strata Solar. This was scheduled to be the largest PV plant east of the Mississippi River as of the announcement date.
- Elm City Solar Facility (40 MW) – Wilson County, developed by HelioSage Energy
- Fayetteville Solar Facility (23 MW) – Bladen County, developed by Tangent Energy Solutions

In addition, Duke Energy plans to purchase energy from five new projects:

- 48 MW – Bladen County, developed by Innovative Solar Systems
- 48 MW – Richmond County, developed by FLS Energy
- 20 MW – Scotland County, developed by Birdseye Renewable Energy
- 19 MW – Cleveland County, developed by Birdseye Renewable Energy
- 15 MW – Beaufort County, developed by Element Power US

Since Duke Energy's $500 million commitment to expand solar power in North Carolina in 2014, the company has made significant progress in increasing its solar capacity and advancing renewable energy initiatives in the 2020s:

- Construction of new solar plants (January 2022): Duke Energy began constructing nearly 100 megawatts of new solar capacity in North Carolina, further expanding its renewable energy portfolio.
- Collaboration with Wells Fargo and NextEra Energy Resources (April 2021): Duke Energy partnered with Wells Fargo and NextEra Energy Resources to develop a 58-megawatt solar power plant in Catawba County, under the Green Source Advantage program.
- Green Source Advantage program expansion (October 2024): Duke Energy expanded its Green Source Advantage program, enabling more businesses to access renewable energy and work towards carbon-free operations.
- Carolinas Resource Plan Approval (November 2024): The North Carolina Utilities Commission approved Duke Energy's Carolinas Resource Plan, which outlines the addition of multiple gigawatts of solar photovoltaic (PV) capacity over the next six years.

Duke Energy explains their investments in renewable energy are driven by a commitment to environmental sustainability, regulatory compliance, and customer demand for cleaner energy options. The company aims to reduce carbon emissions by 50% by 2030 and achieve net-zero emissions by 2050, aligning with environmental goals and regulatory expectations.

== Generation ==
Using data available from the U.S. Energy Information Agency's Electric Power Annual 2017 and "Electric Power Monthly Data Browser", the following table summarizes North Carolina's solar energy posture.

Solar-electric generation in North Carolina
Year	Facilities	Summer capacity (MW)	Electric energy (GWh or M kWh)	Capacity factor	Yearly growth of generating capacity	Yearly growth of produced energy	% of NC renewable electric energy	% of NC generated electric energy	% of U.S. solar electric energy
2018	523	3982	6997	0.201	18.7%	25.4%	53.5%	5.2%	10.5%
2017	481	3355	5579	0.190	37.7%	63.1%	51.6%	4.3%	10.5%
2016	411	2437	3421	0.16	69.6%	149%	32.9%	2.6%	9.5%
2015	262	1436.8	1374	0.11	112.5%	88.5%	15.8%	1.07%	5.5%
2014		676	729	0.123	103%	111%	9.10%	0.60%	4.10%
2013	84	333.2	345	0.176	190.8%	148.2%	3.5%	0.27%	3.82%
2012	38	114.6	139	0.199	156.4%	717.7%	2.16%	0.12%	3.21%
2011	15	44.7	17	0.049	27.7%	54.6%	0.27%	0.01%	0.94%
2010	9	35	11	0.066	1067%	120%	0.16%	0.01%	0.91%
2009	3	3	5	0.190	0%	150%	0.07%	0.00%	0.56%
2008	3	3	2	0.152	0%	0%	0.04%	0.00%	0.23%
2007	0	0	0	0	0%	0%	0.00%	0.00%	0.00%

In summary, solar-electric generation increased from 2007 to 2018 at a decreasing rate. The percentage of solar generated electric energy has steadily increased, but the yearly growth of generating capacity and yearly growth of produced energy peaked in 2012–2013.

Capacity factor for each year was computed from the end-of-year summer capacity. 2018 data is from Electric Power Monthly and is subject to change.

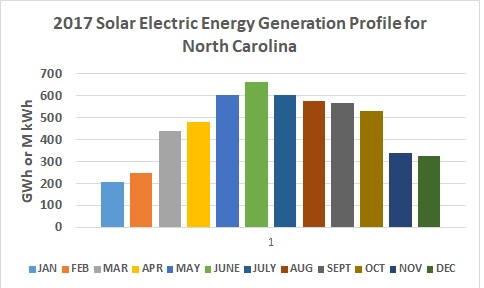
2017 North Carolina solar energy generation profile

NC utility scale solar generation (GWh, million kWh)
Year	Jan	Feb	Mar	Apr	May	Jun	Jul	Aug	Sept	Oct	Nov	Dec	Total
2011													17
2012	2	2	4	6	6	6	9	7	9	17	23	48	139
2013	10	17	24	21	32	34	34	32	36	40	30	35	345
2014	31	41	56	58	74	67	69	75	68	88	49	54	729
2015	63	52	95	110	160	151	167	156	109	100	76	135	1,374
2016	168	175	348	300	265	320	336	448	328	254	182	298	3,421
2017	265	335	423	477	534	482	537	480	473	423	372	314	5,115
2018	402	356	514	632	629	677	643	658	440	483	369	308	6,111
2019	410	398	661	680	772	753	838	749	683	556	481	472	7,451
2020	477	492	641	872	873	850	955	766	650	660	552	484	8,274
2021	517	520	817	1018	1085	990	1037	986	916	775	715	548	9,922
2022	635	719	969	1157	1173	1251	1174	1111	1048	938	664	534	11,373

Beginning with the 2014 data year, the Energy Information Administration (EIA) has estimated the distributed solar-photovoltaic generation and distributed solar-photovoltaic capacity. These non-utility-scale appraisals evaluate that North Carolina generated the following amounts of additional solar energy:

Estimated distributed solar electric generation in North Carolina
Year	Summer capacity (MW)	Electric energy (GWh or M kWh)
2014	56.8	72
2015	71.7	84
2016	109.7	167
2017	114.9	186
2018	140.1	212
2019	180.2	260
2020	200.0	310
2021	230.5	360
2022	260.7	420
2023	290.0	430
2024	320.0	473

Grid-connected PV capacity
Year	Total (MW)	Installed (MW)	~% change
2007	0.7		
2008	4.7	4	571.4%
2009	12.5	7.8	166%
2010	40	28.7	220%
2011	85.5	45.5	114%
2012	207.9	122.4	143%
2013	469	261.1	126%
2014	849	380	81%
2015	1,974	1,125	132%
2016	2,984	1,010	51%
2017	3,287.5	303.5	10%
2018	4,692.1	1,404.6	42.7%
2019	6,152.3	1,460.2	31%
2020	7,037.8	885.5	14%
2021	7,811.2	773.4	11%
2022	8,179	367.8	4.7%
2023	9,054	875	10.7%
2024	9,698	644	7.1%

== Duke Energy rebates ==
On January 22, 2018, Duke Energy Renewables proposed a $62 million rebate program for both residential and nonresidential customers. It was the first of three programs Duke is proposing as part of "Competitive Energy Solutions for North Carolina" legislation, signed into law in 2017 by Gov. Roy Cooper. The program requires approval from the North Carolina Utilities Commission.

Proposal details
Electricity customer	Eligible rebate	Maximum rebate
Residential (10 kilowatts or less)	60 cents per watt	$6,000
Nonresidential	50 cents per watt	$50,000
Nonprofit entity	75 cents per watt	$75,000

Customers would also have the option of leasing solar equipment from a third-party.

On April 16, 2018, the North Carolina Utilities Commission approved the program. It applies to Duke Energy's residential, nonresidential and nonprofit customers who installed a solar system and a bi-directional meter on their property on or after January 1, 2018.

== EnergizeNC: North Carolina's Solar for All program ==
The EnergizeNC coalition was awarded a $156 million grant on April 22, 2024, by the Environmental Protection Agency (EPA). The grant is part of the $7 billion Solar for All program, which seeks to invest in solar projects for low-income and disadvantaged communities. EnergizeNC has three focus areas for solar: rooftop installation in single-family homes, behind-the-meter installations in multifamily housing and non-profit buildings and community solar programs (electric co-ops). The program is expected to launch statewide in the fall of 2025.

== Duke Energy solar centers ==
A solar center is a facility that has thousands of installed solar panels. Duke Energy has proposed projects for a variety of solar centers using PV panels. The plan is to have the centers operating by late 2025. They are estimated to produce enough electricity to power 23,000 homes.

Solar center	Location	Megawatts	Number of solar panels
Bailey Mill	Jefferson County	74.9 MW	~163,000
Half Moon	Sumter County	74.9 MW	~142,000
Rattler	Hernando County	74.9 MW	~210,000

In the chart above are the plans for facilities in various areas. Also, a proposed plan in North Carolina, known as the Longleaf Solar Center, will be located in New Hill, NC. It is proposed to be completed in 2028. It is said to be a 100 MW facility with about 215,000 solar panels and the ability to power 27,900 homes.

== Pricing of solar energy ==
The price of solar power in North Carolina has been steadily decreasing since its introduction. Currently, the average price for one watt of solar power is $2.29 during the installation process. This has also decreased further via economic incentives and subsidies. The federal solar tax credit reduces the cost of installation by up to 30%. The average period for the solar powers to pay for their own installation, however, is 11 years in North Carolina.

Wattage	Cost
6W	$13.72
7W	$16.00
8W	$18.29
9W	$20.56
10W	$22.26

There are also systems in place such as home equity loans, also known as home equity line of credit (HELOC), which utilize the house as collateral, providing a lump sum payment that can be paid back over the course of several years. This aids in covering the initial high cost of a full 3-10 kW solar power system, which may not be affordable for some people without financing.

== Solar power distribution potential ==
Source: NREL

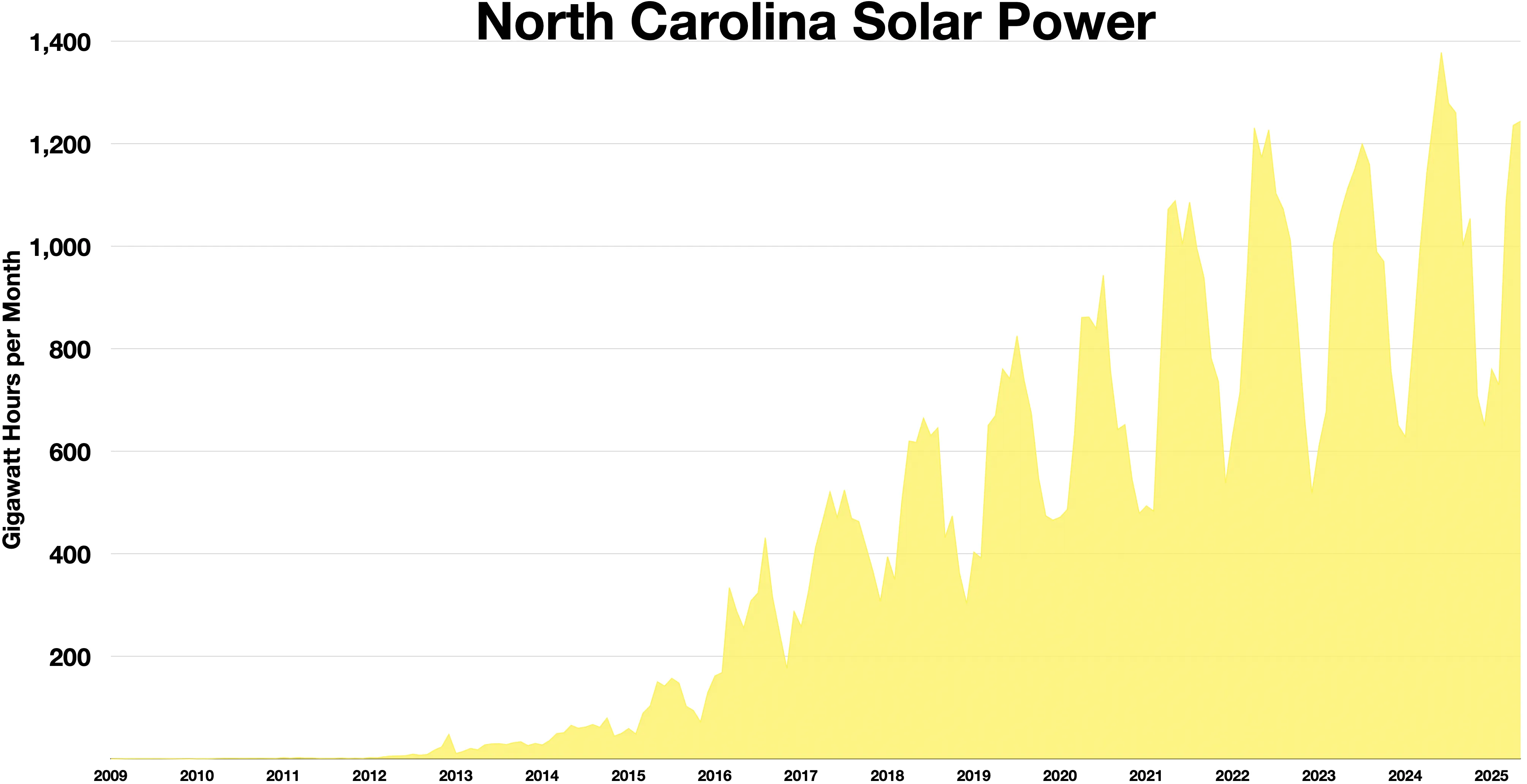
North Carolina solar power

Solar power has been increasing rapidly in the U.S. state of North Carolina, from less than 1 MW (megawatts) in 2007 to 6,152 MW in 2019, when it had the second-largest installed PV capacity of all states.

Research efforts are ongoing to improve and maximize the amount of North Carolina's energy that is sourced from solar energy. One area of interest is agricultural land that has an adjacent water shed. A case study was performed in 2020 to find potential areas that would maximize the economic impact of solar farms and minimize the impacts on land and the environment. The environmental impacts were found to be minimal compared to other energy sources like coal and fossil fuels that create pollution in the runoff and water sheds. The study also found that in the eastern part of the state there already exists a relationship between farmlands and active solar farms. It was shown that many agricultural areas are located by watersheds that have high levels of water pollution and damage caused by current energy practices. The study concluded that using agricultural land adjacent to water sheds has high potential. With the availability of this land and the benefits associated, solar energy has the potential to source up to 40% of North Carolina's total energy production.

== Gallery ==
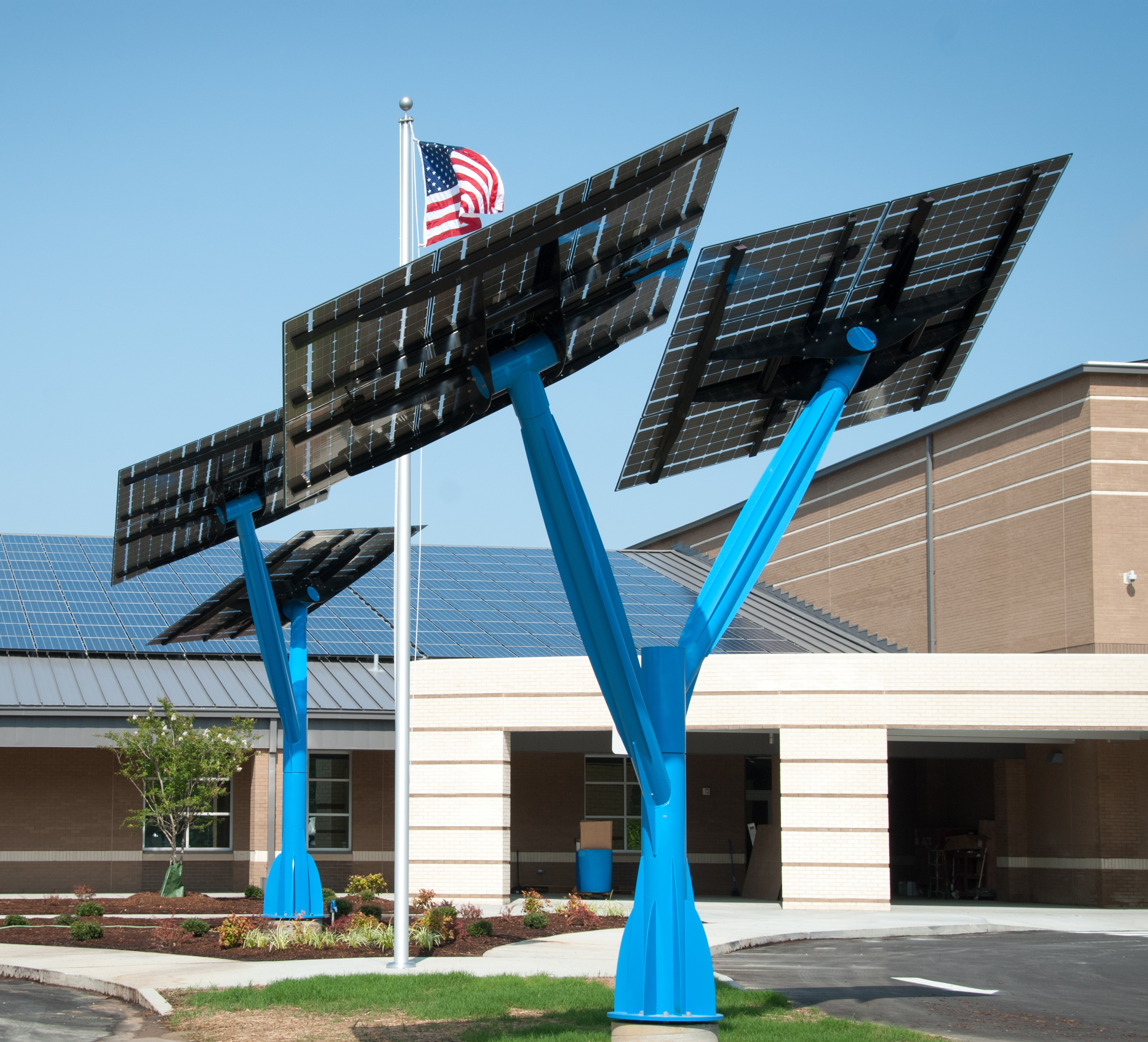
Solar installation, Sandy Grove Middle School, Robeson County

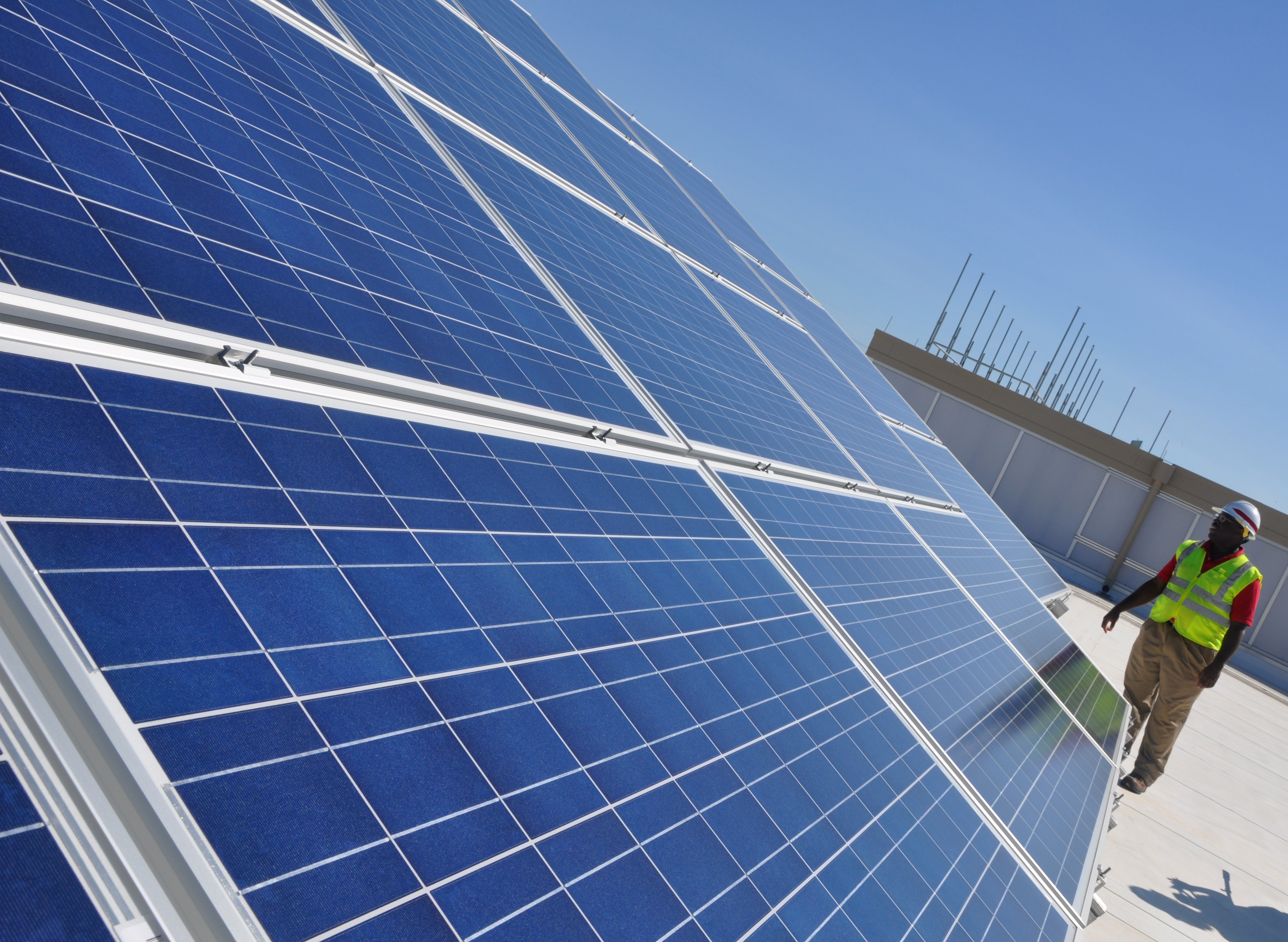
Solar installation, Fort Bragg

== See also ==
- Solar power in the United States
- Renewable energy in the United States
