= List of professional sports teams in North Carolina =

The following is a list of professional sports teams in North Carolina.

== Baseball ==
=== International League ===
- Charlotte Knights
- Durham Bulls

=== South Atlantic League ===
- Asheville Tourists
- Greensboro Grasshoppers
- Winston-Salem Dash

=== Carolina League ===
- Carolina Mudcats
- Fayetteville Woodpeckers
- Hickory Crawdads
- Kannapolis Cannon Ballers

=== Atlantic League (MLB Partner League) ===
- Gastonia Ghost Peppers
- High Point Rockers

=== Frontier League (MLB Partner League) ===
- Down East Bird Dawgs

== Basketball ==
=== National Basketball Association ===
- Charlotte Hornets

=== Upshot League ===
- Charlotte Crown
- Greensboro Groove

=== NBA G League ===
- Greensboro Swarm

=== East Coast Basketball League ===
- Charlotte Tribe
- East Carolina Cardinals
- Hickory Hoyas
- NC Coyotes
- Winston-Salem Wolves

=== The Basketball League ===
- Raleigh Firebirds

== Football ==
=== National Football League ===
- Carolina Panthers

=== National Arena League (Arena Football) ===
- Carolina Cobras (NAL)

=== American Arena League (Arena Football) ===
- Charlotte Thunder

== Hockey ==
=== National Hockey League ===
- Carolina Hurricanes

=== American Hockey League ===
- Charlotte Checkers

=== SPHL ===
- Fayetteville Marksmen

=== Federal Prospects Hockey League ===
- Carolina Thunderbirds

=== East Coast Hockey League ===
- Greensboro Gargoyles

== Motorsports ==
=== NASCAR Cup Series ===
- 23XI Racing
- Front Row Motorsports
- Haas Factory Team
- Hendrick Motorsports
- Hyak Motorsports
- Joe Gibbs Racing
- Legacy Motor Club
- RFK Racing
- Richard Childress Racing
- Team Penske

=== Formula One ===
- Haas F1 Team

== Soccer ==
=== Major League Soccer ===
- Charlotte FC

=== National Women's Soccer League ===
- North Carolina Courage

=== USL Super League ===
- Carolina Ascent FC

=== USL Championship ===
- Charlotte Independence

=== MLS Next Pro ===
- Carolina Core FC

== Rugby ==
=== Major League Rugby ===
- Anthem Rugby Carolina

== Lacrosse ==
=== Professional Lacrosse League ===
- Carolina Chaos

== See also ==
- Sports in North Carolina
- List of sports venues in North Carolina
