= List of power stations in North Carolina =

Sources of North Carolina utility-scale electricity generation in gigawatt-hours, full-year 2025:
1. Natural gas: 54,217 (40.0%)
2. Nuclear: 43,047 (31.8%)
3. Coal: 17,902 (13.2%)
4. Solar: 12,752 (9.42%)
5. Hydroelectric: 4,650 (3.43%)
6. Biomass: 1,539 (1.14%)
7. Wind: 936 (0.69%)
8. Petroleum: 192 (0.14%)
9. Other: 202 (0.15%)

This is a list of electricity-generating power stations in the U.S. state of North Carolina, sorted by type and name. In 2024, North Carolina had a total summer capacity of 36.3 GW through all of its power plants, and a net generation of 134,965 GWh. In 2025, the electrical energy generation mix was 40% natural gas, 31.8% nuclear, 13.2% coal, 9.4% solar, 3.4% hydroelectric, 1.1% biomass, 0.7% wind, 0.1% petroleum, and 0.2% other. Small-scale solar including customer-owned photovoltaic panels delivered an additional net 1,009 GWh of energy to the state's electrical grid in 2025. This was more than 12 times less than the 12,752 GWh generated by North Carolina's utility-scale photovoltaic plants.

As in other states, electricity generation by coal in North Carolina has been shifting to natural gas and renewables. Gas has nearly equaled the generation by nuclear since 2016. The state was also a top-ten state in the nation for production of nuclear energy.

At the end of 2025, North Carolina had the sixth-highest solar generation and fifth-highest installed capacity in the nation at almost 7,700 megawatts. Solar generation exceeded hydroelectricity in 2017.

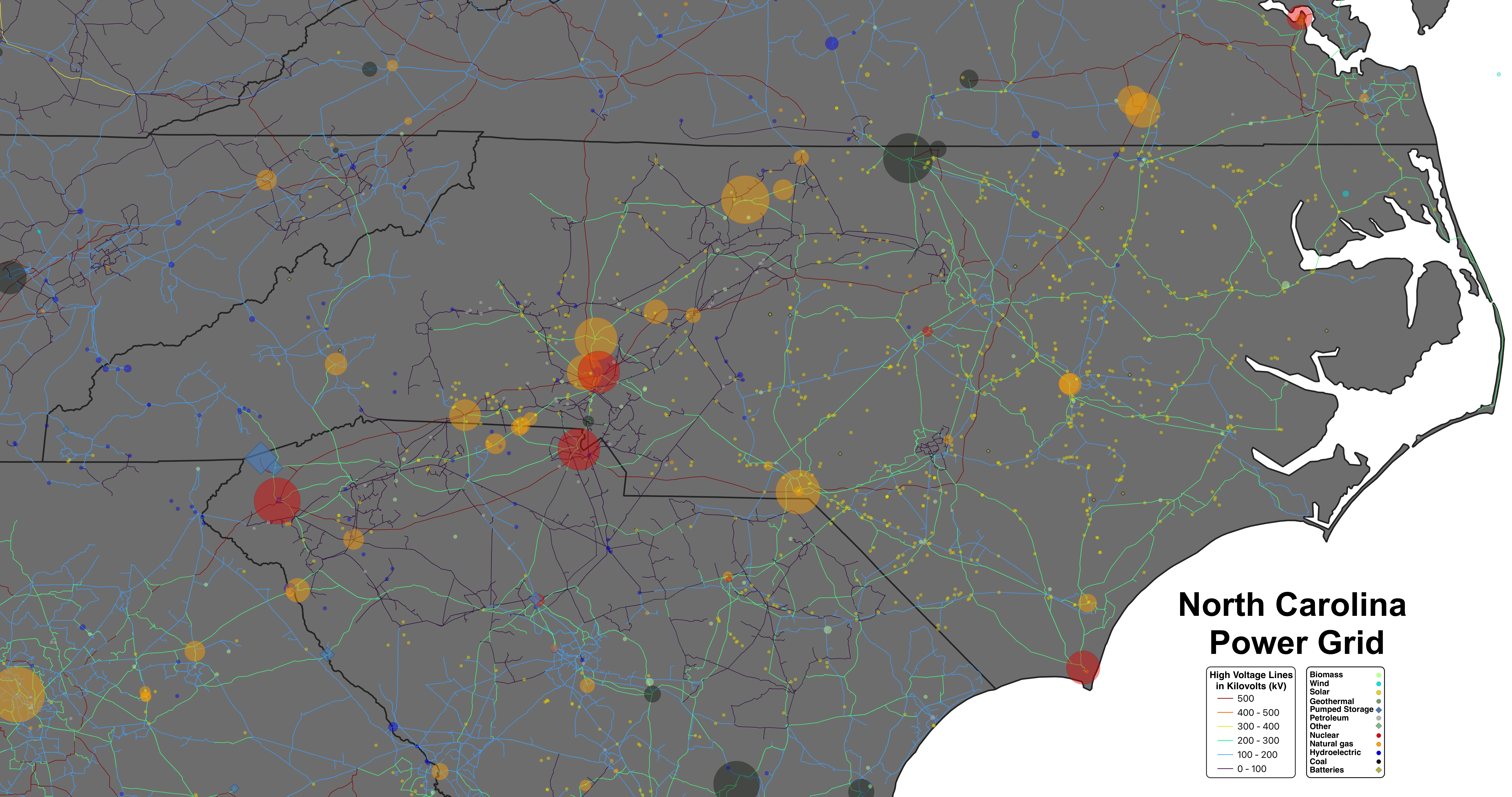
North Carolina power grid

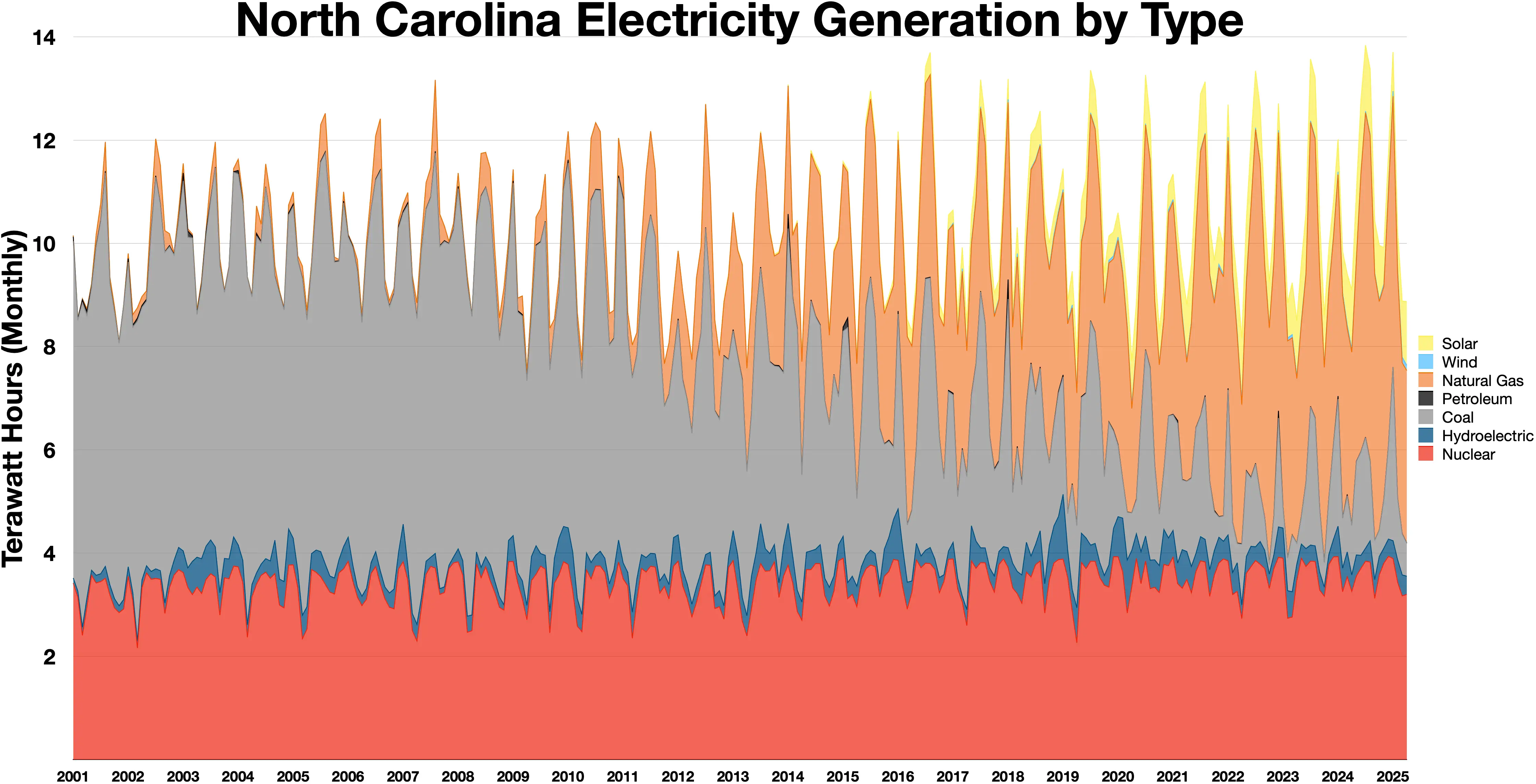
North Carolina electricity generation by type

== Nuclear power stations ==
Data from the U.S. Energy Information Administration.

Name	Location	Capacity (MW)	Owner	Type	Year opened	Ref
Brunswick Nuclear Generating Station	33°57′30″N 78°0′37″W	1870	Duke Energy	Boiling water reactor (2 units)	1977 (Unit 1 - 938MW); 1975 (Unit 2 - 932MW)	
McGuire Nuclear Station	35°25′57″N 80°56′54″W	2316	Duke Energy	Pressurized water reactor (2 units)	1981 (Unit 1 - 1158MW); 1984 (Unit 2 - 1158MW)	
Shearon Harris Nuclear Power Plant	35°38.0′N 78°57.3′W	928	Progress Energy	Pressurized water reactor (1 unit)	1987	

== Fossil-fuel power stations ==
Data from the U.S. Energy Information Administration.

=== Coal ===
Name	Location	Capacity (MW)	Owner	Year opened	Ref	Notes
Asheville Energy Plant	35.4731°N 82.5417°W	378	Duke Energy	1964 (Unit 1 - 189MW); 1971 (Unit 2 - 189MW)		Retired 2020
Belews Creek Steam Station	36.2811°N 80.0603°W	2220	Duke Energy	1974 (Unit 1 - 1110MW); 1975 (Unit 2 - 1110MW)		
Canton Mill Power Plant	35.5350°N 82.8411°W	52.5	Blue Ridge; Paper Products	1937 (Unit 1 - 7.5MW); 1941 (Unit 2 - 7.5MW); 1946 (Unit 3 - 7.5MW); 1949 (Unit 4 - 7.5MW); 1952 (Unit 5 - 10MW); 1979 (Unit 6 - 12.5MW)		
G. G. Allen Steam Station	35.1897°N 81.0122°W	1098	Duke Energy	1957 (Unit 1 - 162MW); 1957 (Unit 2 - 162MW); 1959 (Unit 3 - 258MW); 1960 (Unit 4 - 257MW); 1961 (Unit 5 - 259MW)		Retired 2024
James E. Rogers Energy Complex	35.22°N 81.7594°W	1388	Duke Energy	1972 (Unit 1- 544MW); 2012 (Unit 2- 844MW)		
Marshall Steam Station	35.5975°N 80.9658°W	2058	Duke Energy	1965 (Unit 1 - 370MW); 1966 (Unit 2 - 370MW); 1969 (Unit 3 - 658MW); 1970 (Unit 4 - 660MW)		
Mayo Plant	36.5278°N 78.8917°W	727	Duke Energy	1983		
Roxboro Steam Plant	36.4833°N 79.0731°W	2439	Duke Energy	1966 (Unit 1 - 379MW); 1968 (Unit 2 - 668MW); 1973 (Unit 3 - 694MW); 1980 (Unit 4 - 698MW)		
UNC Chapel Hill Cogen Facility	35.9069°N 79.0617°W	28	UNC-Chapel Hill	1991		

=== Natural gas ===
Name	Location	Capacity (MW)	Owner	Generation type	Year opened	Ref
ADM Southport	33.9397°N 77.9905°W	45	Archer Daniels Midland	Simple cycle (x3)	1992/1995	
Anson County Generating Facility	34.9686°N 79.9217°W	340	NCEMC	Simple cycle (x6)	2007	
Asheville Station	35.4731°N 82.5417°W	613	Duke Energy	Simple cycle (x2), 1x1 combined cycle	1999/2000 (320MW); 2019 (293MW)	
Buck Station	35.7133°N 80.3767°W	668	Duke Energy	2x1 combined cycle	2011	
Butler-Warner Generation Plant	35.0986°N 78.8294°W	225	City of Fayetteville	Simple cycle (x2), 6x1 combined cycle	1976-1980 (40MW); 1988 (185MW)	
Cleveland Generating Plant	35.1705°N 81.4166°W	720	Southern Company	Simple cycle (x4)	2012	
Dan River Station	36.4862°N 79.7208°W	662	Duke Energy	2x1 combined cycle	2012	
H.F. Lee Energy Complex	35.3736°N 78.0894°W	888	Duke Energy	3x1 combined cycle	2012	
Hamlet Generating Facility	34.842°N 79.7360°W	339	NCEMC	Simple cycle (x6)	2007/2013	
Kings Mountain Energy Center	35.2025°N 81.3631°W	486	NTE Energy	1x1 combined cycle	2018	
L.V. Sutton Plant	34.2831°N 77.9852°W	685	Duke Energy	2x1 combined cycle, simple cycle (x2)	2013 (607MW); 2017 (78MW)	
Lincoln Combustion Turbine	35.4317°N 81.0347°W	1200	Duke Energy	Simple cycle (x16)	1995-1996	
Monroe Station	34.9858°N 80.5060°W	24	NC Muni Pwr Agency	Simple cycle (x2)	2010	
NCSU Cates Cogen	35.7840°N 78.6747°W	9.4	NC State Univ.	Simple cycle (x2)	2012	
NCSU Central Campus Cogen	35.7756°N 78.6737°W	6.3	NC State Univ.	Simple cycle, steam turbine	2019 (5.3MW); 2019 (1MW)	
Rockingham Station	36.3297°N 79.8297°W	825	Duke Energy	Single cycle (x5)	2000	
Rowan Plant	35.7314°N 80.6019°W	961	Southern Company	Simple cycle (x3), 2x1 combined cycle	2001 (462MW); 2003 (499MW)	
Sherwood H. Smith Jr. Energy Complex	34.8392°N 79.7406°W	1808	Duke Energy	Simple cycle (x5), 2x1 combined cycle (x2)	2001-2002 (723MW); 2002/2011 (1085MW)	
Wayne County Plant	35.3758°N 78.0981°W	857	Duke Energy	Simple cycle (x5)	2000/2009	

== Renewable power stations ==
Data from the U.S. Energy Information Administration.

=== Biomass and industrial waste ===
Name	Coordinates	Capacity (MW)	Primary fuel	Generation type	Year opened	Refs	Notes
Concord Energy	35.3460°N 80.6704°W	7.8	Landfill gas	Reciprocating engine (x2)	2012		
CPI - Roxboro	36.4350°N 78.9619°W	47.0	Wood/wood waste, tire-derived fuel, coal	Steam turbine	1987		Closed 2021
CPI - Southport	33.9444°N 78.0118°W	96.0	Wood/wood waste, tire-derived fuel, coal	Steam turbine (x2)	1987		Closed 2021
Craven County Wood Energy	35.1302°N 77.1679°W	47.0	Wood/wood waste	Steam turbine	1990		
Domtar Paper - Plymouth Mill	35.8628°N 76.7831°W	122.3	Wood/wood waste	Steam turbine (x3)	1952/1976/1978		
Gaston County REC	35.3857°N 81.1720°W	4.2	Landfill gas	Reciprocating engine (x3)	2011		
International Paper - New Bern Mill	35.2120°N 77.1144°W	29.0	Wood/wood waste	Steam turbine	2014		
International Paper - Riegelwood	34.3533°N 78.2137°W	52.3	Wood/wood waste	Steam turbine (x2)	1951/1976		
KapStone Kraft Paper	36.4769°N 77.6414°W	30.0	Wood/wood waste	Steam turbine	1966		
Lumberton	34.5900°N 78.9968°W	34.7	Wood/wood waste	Steam turbine	1985		
New Bern LFG	35.1681°N 77.2267°W	5.4	Landfill gas	Reciprocating engine (x18)	2007/2011		
Sampson County Disposal	34.9856°N 78.4625°W	9.6	Landfill gas	Reciprocating engine (x6)	2011/2014		
Uwharrie Mountain Renewable	35.3330°N 79.9649°W	9.6	Landfill gas	Reciprocating engine (x6)	2014		
Wake County LFG Facility	35.6740°N 78.8540°W	9.0	Landfill gas	Reciprocating engine (x30)	2013/2015/2019		

=== Hydroelectric ===
Name	Location	Capacity (MW)	Owner	Ref	Notes
Cowans Ford Hydroelectric Station	35.4346°N 80.9588°W	324	Duke Energy		
Fontana Dam Powerplant	35.4507°N 83.805°W	304	Tennessee Valley Authority		
Gaston Hydro Station	36.4991°N 77.8115°W	220	Dominion Energy		
Mountain Island Hydro Station	35.3342°N 80.9864°W	60	Duke Energy		
Roanoke Rapids Power Station	36.4789°N 77.6722°W	95	Dominion Energy		
Tillery Hydro Station	35.2067°N 80.0648°W	84	Duke Energy		
Walters Hydroelectric Plant	35.6946°N 83.0503°W	112	Duke Energy		
Jordan Lake Hydroelectric Project	35.6549N 79.0683W	4.4	Jordan Hydroelectric L.P.		

=== Solar ===
Name	Location	Capacity (MW_{AC})	Owner	Year opened	Ref	Notes
Aulander Holloman Solar	36.2912°N 77.0666°W	80.0	SunEnergy; Fifth Third Bancorp	2018		
Chestnut Solar	36.18°N 77.712°W	75	Dominion Energy	2020		
Conetoe Solar (I&II)	35.8220°N 77.4810°W	85.0	SunEnergy; Duke Energy	2015		
Crooked Run	34.6770°N 77.9775°W	70.1	Cypress Creek Renewables	2019		
Davidson Solar	35°44′57″N 80°17′37″W	17.2	SunEdison; Duke Energy	2011		
Gutenberg Solar	36.4864°N 77.5348°W	79.9	Dominion Energy	2019		
Innovative Solar 37	34.838°N 79.9439°W	100.0	Dominion Energy	2017		
Innovative Solar 42	34.8476°N 78.8774°W	71.0	Recurrent Energy	2017		
Innovative Solar 46	34.9182°N 78.9436°W	78.5	Cypress Creek Renewables	2016		
NC 102 Project	35.2925°N 80.4975°W	74.8	Recurrent Energy	2017		
Pecan Solar	36.4810°N 77.4812°W	74.9	Dominion Energy	2018		
Ranchland Solar	36.4726°N 76.1541°W	60.0	SunEnergy	2017		
Rutherford Farm	35.2578°N 81.8306°W	74.8	Southern Company	2016		
Shoe Creek Solar	34.8450°N 79.3847°W	65.0	Cypress Creek Renewables	2017		
Summit Farms	36.4765°N 76.1360°W	60.0	Dominion Energy	2016		
Warsaw Farm	35.0056°N 78.1258°W	65.0	Duke Energy	2015		
Wilkinson Solar	35.5968°N 76.7638°W	80.6	Dominion Energy	2019		

=== Wind ===
Name	Location	Capacity (MW)	Owner	Ref	Notes
Desert Wind Farm	36°18′36″N 76°25′12″W	208	Iberdrola Renewables		

== Storage power stations ==
Data from the U.S. Energy Information Administration.

=== Battery storage ===
Plant	Coords.	Capacity (MW)	Owner	Year opened	Ref
Ocracoke Hybrid	35°06′34″N 75°58′47″W	1.0	NCEMC	2017	

=== Pumped storage ===
Plant	Coords.	Capacity (MW)	Number of turbines	Owner	Year opened	Ref
Hiwassee Dam	35°09′03″N 84°10′39″W	95	1	Tennessee Valley Authority	1956	

== Cancelled ==
- South River Nuclear Power Plant

== See also ==
- List of power stations in the United States
