= Lake Norman of Iredell, North Carolina =

Lake Norman of Iredell
- Census-designated place
- Location within North Carolina Location within the United States
- Coordinates: 35°32′36″N 80°55′43″W
- Country: United States
- State: North Carolina
- County: Iredell

Area
  - Total: 18.8 sq mi (48.7 km^{2})
  - Land: 10.1 sq mi (26.2 km^{2})
  - Water: 8.6 sq mi (22.4 km^{2})
- Elevation: 768 ft (234 m)

Population (2020)
  - Total: 11,395
  - Density: 606.0/sq mi (233.98/km^{2})
- Time zone: UTC-5 (Eastern (EST))
  - Summer (DST): UTC-4 (EDT)
- ZIP Code: 28117 (Mooresville)
- Area codes: 704/980
- FIPS code: 37-36511
- GNIS feature ID: 2806991

Lake Norman of Iredell is a census-designated place (CDP) in Iredell County, North Carolina, United States. It was first listed as a CDP prior to the 2020 census. The population at the 2020 census was 11,395.

The community is in the southwestern corner of Iredell County and consists of several peninsulas extending into Lake Norman, a large reservoir on the Catawba River. The CDP is bordered to the northeast by the town of Mooresville and to the south, across an arm of the lake, by the town of Cornelius in Mecklenburg County. The CDP is bordered to the southwest, across the main channel of the lake, by the CDP of Westport in Lincoln County, and to the northwest, also across the main channel, by the CDP of Lake Norman of Catawba in Catawba County.

== Demographics ==
=== 2020 census ===
As of the 2020 census, Lake Norman of Iredell had a population of 11,395. The median age was 47.4 years. 23.7% of residents were under the age of 18 and 16.8% of residents were 65 years of age or older. For every 100 females there were 102.6 males, and for every 100 females age 18 and over there were 100.9 males age 18 and over.

100.0% of residents lived in urban areas, while 0.0% lived in rural areas.

There were 4,146 households in Lake Norman of Iredell, of which 35.3% had children under the age of 18 living in them. Of all households, 74.2% were married-couple households, 10.3% were households with a male householder and no spouse or partner present, and 12.4% were households with a female householder and no spouse or partner present. About 14.2% of all households were made up of individuals and 6.7% had someone living alone who was 65 years of age or older.

There were 4,753 housing units, of which 12.8% were vacant. The homeowner vacancy rate was 1.6% and the rental vacancy rate was 15.3%.

Racial composition as of the 2020 census
Race	Number	Percent
White	10,160	89.2%
Black or African American	136	1.2%
American Indian and Alaska Native	26	0.2%
Asian	260	2.3%
Native Hawaiian and Other Pacific Islander	6	0.1%
Some other race	119	1.0%
Two or more races	688	6.0%
Hispanic or Latino (of any race)	514	4.5%
