= Governors Island (North Carolina) =

Island and community in North Carolina, US

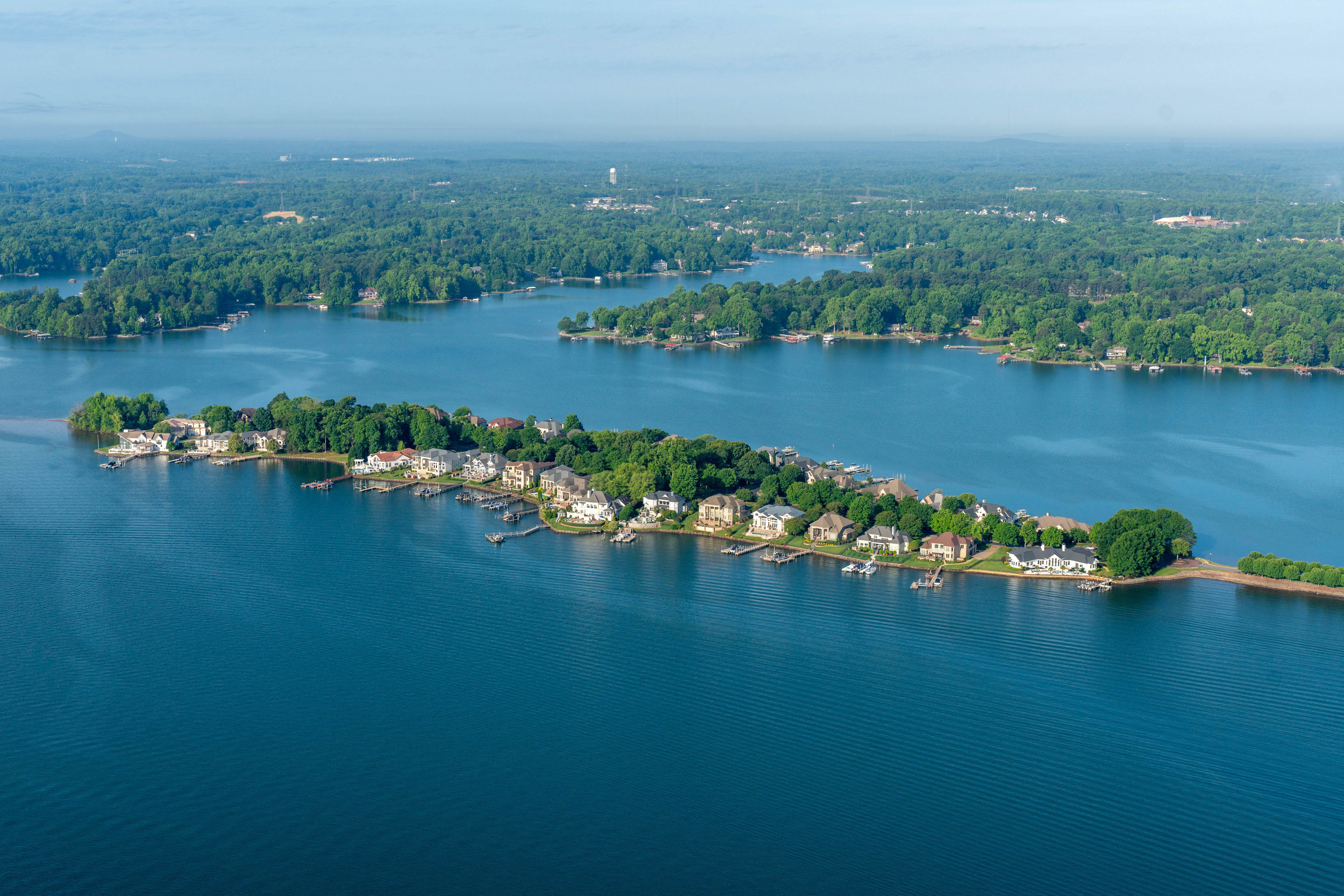

- Location within North Carolina

Geography
- Location: Westport, North Carolina
- Coordinates: 35°30′04″N 80°58′10″W
- Area: 0.0524 sq mi (0.136 km^{2})
- Length: .41 mi (0.66 km)
- Width: .13 mi (0.21 km)
- Coastline: 1.03 mi (1.66 km)
- Highest elevation: 765 ft (233.2 m)

Administration
- United States

Demographics
- Population: 169 (July 2010)

Governors Island is one of the few islands with permanent residents on Lake Norman, in Westport, a community in Catawba Springs Township, in Lincoln County, North Carolina, US. The island is a small, wealthy community located 20 miles northwest of Charlotte, North Carolina, and less than half a mile from mainland Westport in the piedmont of North Carolina. This community is in the Denver, North Carolina, zip code of 28037. The largest subdivision nearby to the north is SailView, a Crescent Community, also in Denver, North Carolina.

Before the region was flooded, the area immediately around Governors Island was farmland, and had been since at least the mid 1700s. The island was named after governor Hutchins G. Burton, who died on a journey from his home in Halifax County and was buried in the nearby area. When the Catawba River was dammed, forming Lake Norman, the area that is now Governors Island was slated to be totally submerged. However, revised calculations showed that it would remain a peninsula. Duke Power company (now Duke Energy) changed the peninsula into an island to facilitate better water flow to the power plants. Before it became a luxury neighborhood, wild goats inhabited the island, giving it the nickname "Goat Island"

The island is accessed via a county-owned bridge from the mainland in Denver. The homes on the island are protected by a sea wall, with each home having a minimum of 100 feet of water frontage.

The gated community is home to 42 home sites, with each home selling for at least $900,000. Almost every home on the island has a dock. The island's neighborhood has a homeowner's association.

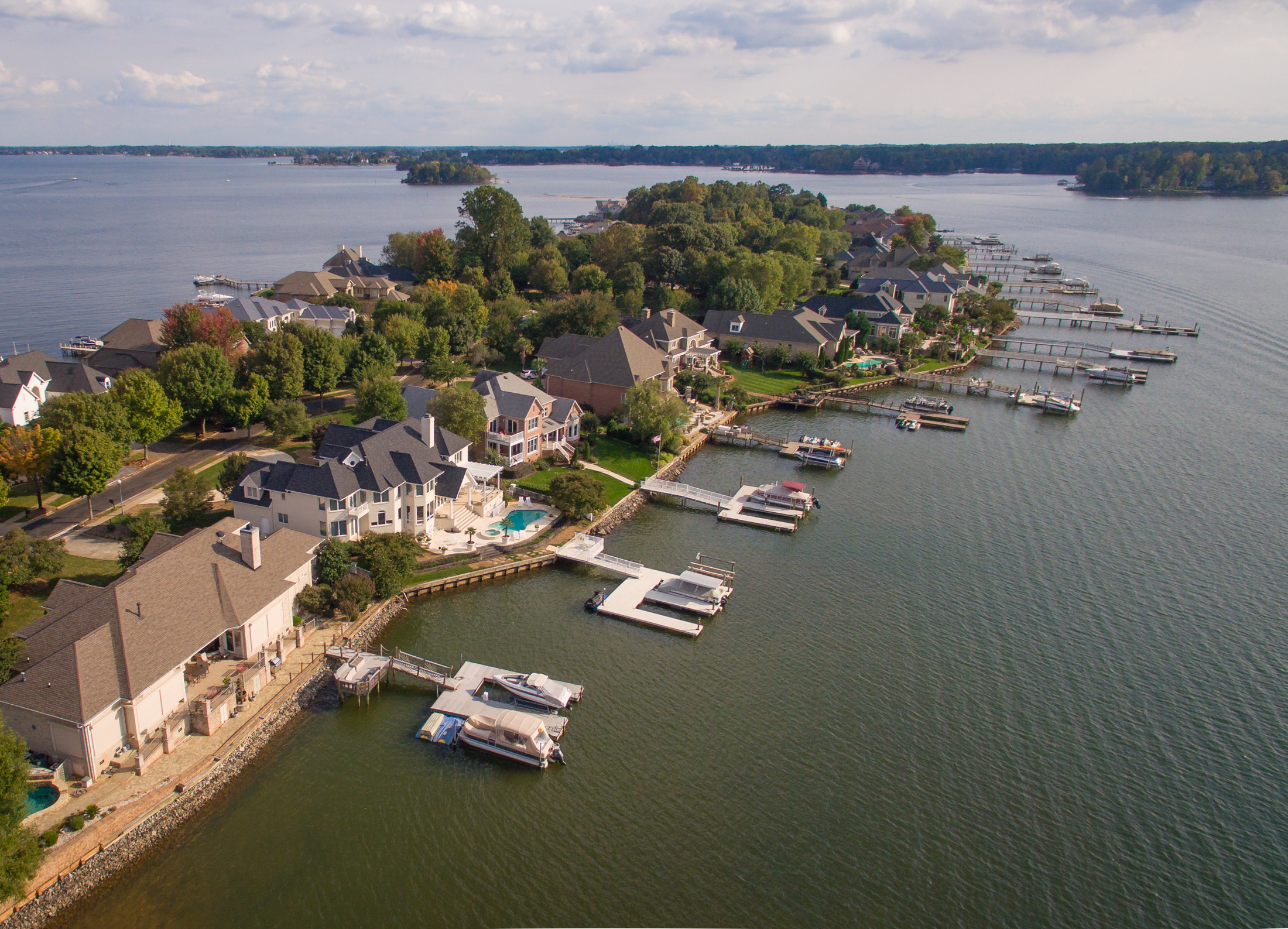
Governors Island, Lake Norman, North Carolina

== Sources ==
- West Lake Norman Community Information
- Governors Island, NC - Real Estate Guide
