= Lake Norman State Park =

State park in North Carolina, United States

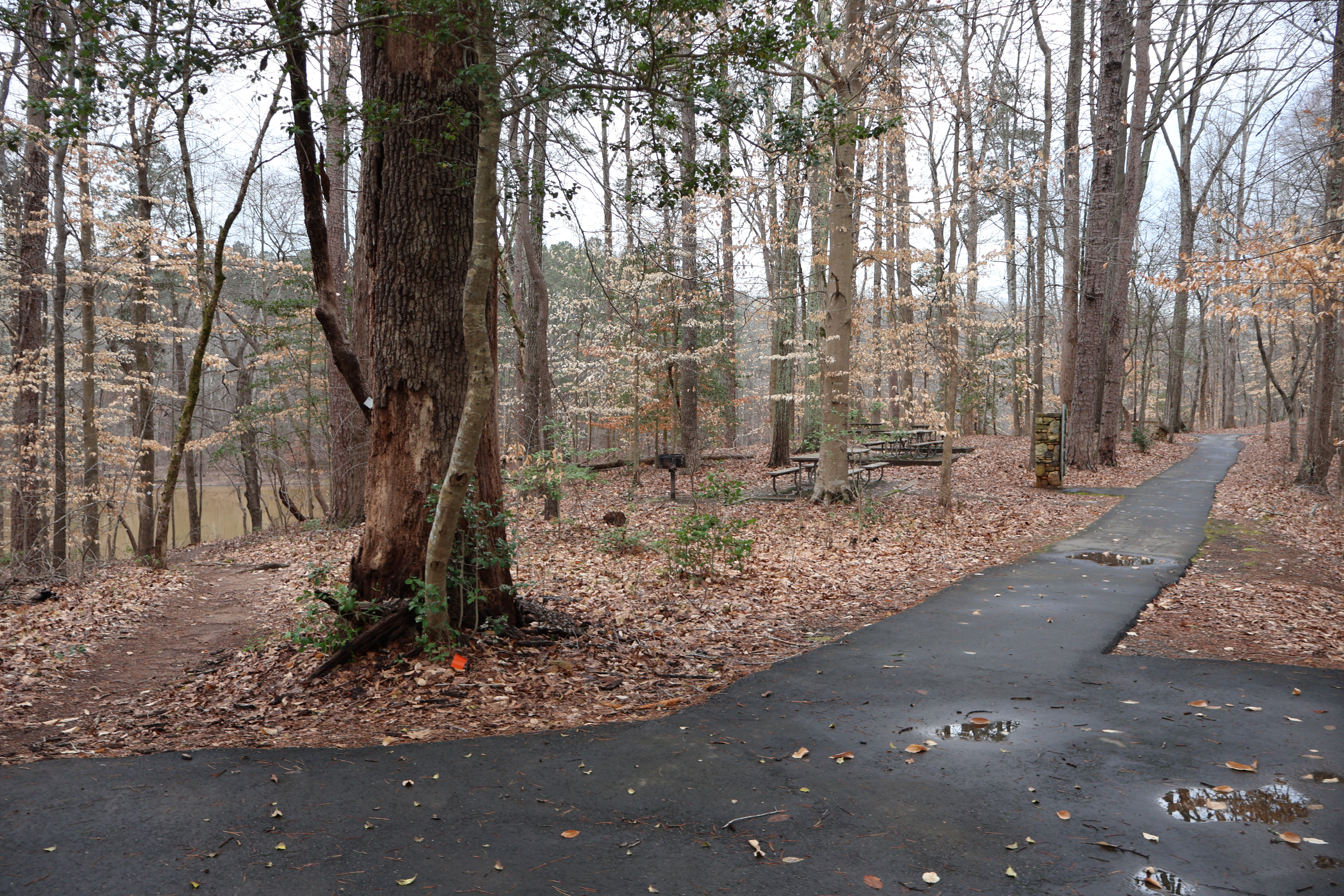

- Location within North Carolina Location within the United States
- Interactive map of Lake Norman State Park
- Location: Troutman and Irede counties, North Carolina, United States
- Coordinates: 35°40′21″N 80°55′57″W
- Area: 1,942 acres (786 ha)
- Elevation: 800 ft (240 m)
- Established: 1962
- Administrator: North Carolina Division of Parks and Recreation
- Website: Official website

Lake Norman State Park, formerly Duke Power State Park, is a 1,942-acre (7.86 km^{2}) North Carolina state park near Troutman, Iredell County, North Carolina in the United States. The park is on the northern shore of Lake Norman at the mouth of Hicks Creek. The park is open for year-round recreation including, boating, fishing, water skiing, swimming and camping. Lake Norman State Park is on Inland Sea Road in Troutman just off U.S. Route 70 between Interstates 40 and 77.

== Lake Norman ==
Lake Norman, created between 1959 and 1964 as part of the construction of the Cowans Ford Dam by Duke Power, is the largest manmade body of fresh water in North Carolina. It is fed by the Catawba River. It was named after former Duke Power president Norman Cocke. Lake Norman is sometimes referred to as the "inland sea"; it offers 520 miles (840 km) of shoreline and a surface area of more than 50 square miles (130 km^{2}).

Lake Norman is a warm water fishery. The common game fish are yellow perch, crappie, bluegill, and striped, largemouth and white bass. Access to Lake Norman is available at the boat ramp within Lake Norman State Park. Use of the docks is free. All visitors to the park are expected to follow the rules and regulations of the North Carolina Wildlife Resource Commission. Rowboat and canoe rentals are available at the marina.

== Recreation ==
Lake Norman State Park is open to recreational opportunities other than boating, swimming and fishing at Lake Norman. Several varieties of campsites are open at the park. Many miles of trails are open to hiking and mountain biking. And an extensive picnic area is open for year-round gatherings.

=== Camping ===
Lake Norman State Park features campsites with tent pads, picnic tables and grills, as well as camper cabins and group camping available to organizations.

=== Trails ===
Alder Trail is a 0.8-mile (1.3 km) loop trail that begins at Park Lake near the main entrance of Lake Norman State Park. This trail passes through the picnic area and circles the peninsula between Norwood and Hicks Creeks near Park Lake.

Lake Shore Trail is a 5-mile (8.0 km) trail on the shore of Lake Norman.

Itusi Trail is a 30.5-mile (49.1 km) mountain biking trail system designed, built and maintained by the Tar Heel Trailblazers, a Charlotte based mountain biking club.

== Wildlife ==
Most of the wildlife at Lake Norman State Park is rarely seen by the casual visitor. This does not mean that wildlife is scarce at the park, in fact a wide variety of eastern woodland creatures call Lake Norman State Park home. The more common mammals of the park are opossum, white-tailed deer, red and gray foxes, rabbits, muskrats, raccoons, and gray squirrels. Amphibians and reptiles can be found on the shores of Lake Norman and in the woods of Lake Norman State Park. The most common amphibians are a variety of frogs. A variety of snakes and turtles can also be seen at the park. Birds commonly seen at the park include, Carolina chickadees, pine warblers, red-tailed hawks, wild turkey, osprey, mallards, Canada geese, and herons.
