= Terrell, North Carolina =

Unincorporated community in North Carolina, United States

Terrell is an unincorporated community in Catawba County, North Carolina, United States. Since the 2010 census, it has been included within the Lake Norman of Catawba CDP.

== Geography ==
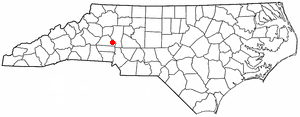
Location of Terrell, North Carolina

Terrell is located at 35°35′20.72″N 80°58′39.5″W within area code 828, ZIP code 28682, and FIPS place code 67180. It sits at an elevation of 289 m (948 ft).

The community center lies at the intersection of North Carolina Highway 150 and Sherrills Ford Road. The widening of NC 150 through Terrell has been delayed numerous times and is currently scheduled for construction in the late 2020s. Neighboring communities include Sherrills Ford to the north and west, Mooresville to the east and Denver to the southwest. Terrell is a Lake Norman community with many lake-centric activities and businesses ("Top of the Lake").

== History ==
The Terrell Historic District is listed in the National Register of Historic Places. The most notable building contained therein was the Terrell Country Store, built in 1891, once a focal point of trade and commerce in the area. The store was removed in 2020.

The town was named after Pinckney Lawson Terrell (1853-1926), a circuit-riding Methodist preacher with ties to the nearby Rehobeth Methodist Church. The Terrell family history reports that a post office was established in 1893 at the T.F. Connor store, and that the community was at that point named for Pinckney Lawson Terrell "because" he had paid all his debts (presumably to the store, but this is speculation only).

Water and sewer lines, primarily trunk lines, were installed in 2013-14 (not all neighborhoods), and a new library opened in 2014.

On May 24, 2016, Publix Supermarkets announced a new store in Terrell, at the intersection of NC 150 and Slanting Bridge Road (northeast corner), to open in late 2017. Publix opened in February 2018.

== Demographics ==
There are approximately 860 people and 332 households residing in the community. The racial makeup of the community is 97.4% White, 1.40% African American, and 1.16% from other races. Hispanics or Latinos of any race were 0.35% of the population.

The mean income for a household in the community is $57,212. Many residents commute to Charlotte from this suburb, either via I-77 on the east side of Lake Norman, or via the equidistant NC 16 on the west side of Lake Norman.

== Schools ==
=== Catawba County Schools ===
- Sherrills Ford Elementary School
- Mill Creek Middle School in Catawba County
- Bandys High School in Catawba County
- Hickory High School / International Baccalaureate (IB) School in Hickory, North Carolina

=== Private schools ===
- University Christian High School located in Hickory, North Carolina
- Woodlawn School located in Iredell County
- Davidson Day School, located in Davidson, North Carolina

=== Charter schools ===
- Langtree Charter School located in Mooresville, North Carolina
- Lincoln Charter School located in Denver, North Carolina
- Pine Lake Preparatory School (Charter School) located in Mooresville, North Carolina

== Notable people ==
- Matt Kenseth – NASCAR driver and 2003 Winston Cup Series champion (resided in Terrell)
- Jason Line – NHRA Pro Stock driver
