= Terrell Historic District =

Historic district in North Carolina, United States

- U.S. National Register of Historic Places
- U.S. Historic district
- Location within North Carolina Location within the United States
- Location: NC 150 and SR 1848, Terrell, North Carolina
- Coordinates: 35°42′26″N 81°04′30″W
- Area: 150 acres (61 ha)
- Built by: Gabriel, R.E.; Et al.
- Architectural style: Greek Revival, Late Victorian
- NRHP reference No.: 86001685
- Added to NRHP: July 15, 1986

Terrell Historic District is a national historic district located at Terrell, Catawba County, North Carolina. The district encompasses 11 contributing buildings in the crossroads community of Terrell. Most of the buildings date from the late-19th and early-20th century and includes notable examples of Greek Revival and Late Victorian style architecture. Notable buildings include the Connor Store and Post Office (c. 1891), Coleman-Caldwell-Gabriel House (c. 1854), Sherrill-Gabriel House (c. 1880s, 1906), Rehobeth Methodist Church (1889, 1950s), Gabriel Cotton Gin (1932), Cotton Storage Building (c. 1930), and Walter Gabriel House (c. 1902).

It was added to the National Register of Historic Places in 1986.
