= Lake Norman =

Man-made lake in North Carolina, United States

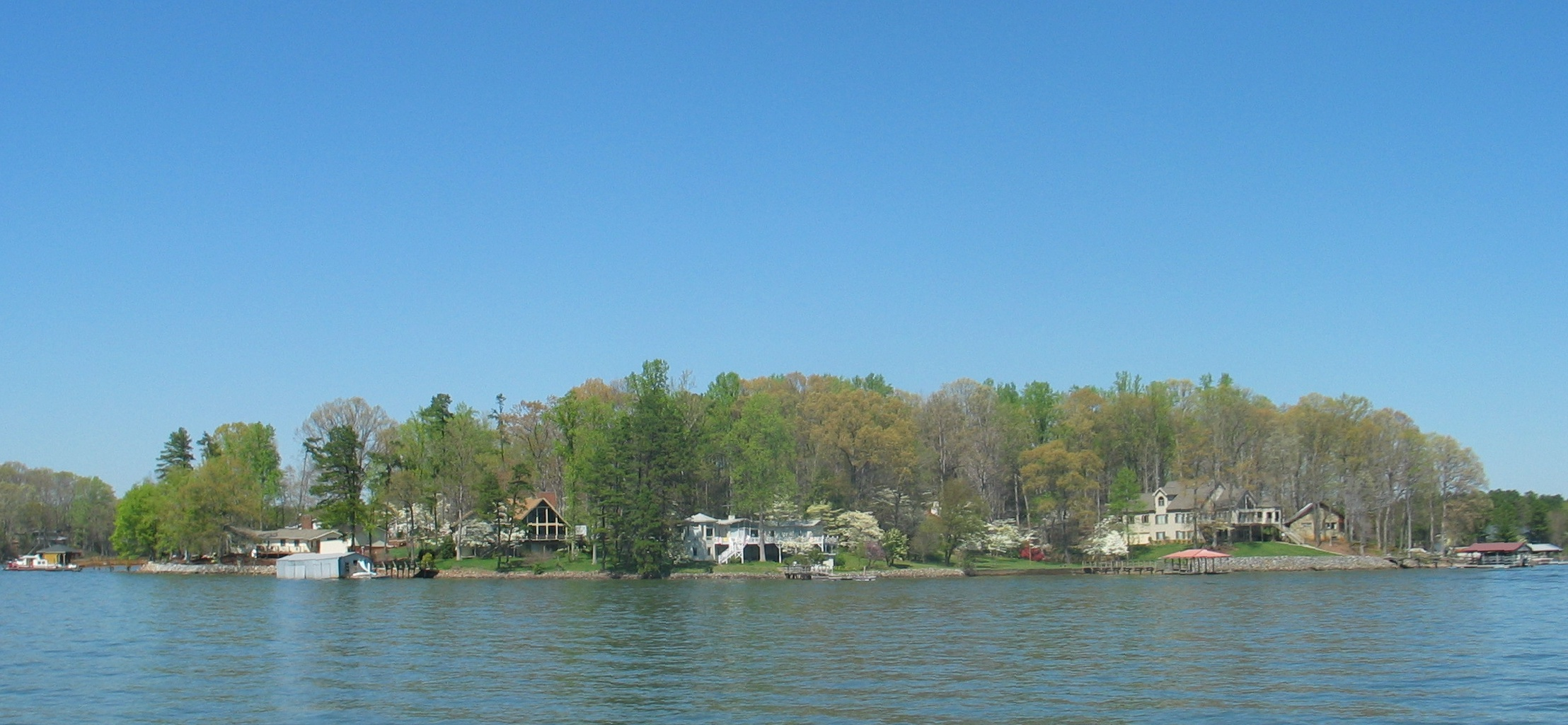
- Typical coastline

- Location within North Carolina Location within the United States
- Location: Catawba / Iredell / Lincoln / Mecklenburg counties, North Carolina, United States
- Coordinates: 35°29′N 80°56′W
- Lake type: Reservoir
- Primary inflows: Catawba River
- Primary outflows: Catawba River via Cowans Ford Dam
- Catchment area: 1,790 square miles (4,600 km^{2})
- Basin countries: United States
- Max. length: 33.6 miles (54.1 km)
- Max. width: 9 miles (14 km)
- Surface area: 32,510 acres (13,160 ha) 50.80 sq mi (132 km^{2})
- Average depth: 33.5 feet (10.2 m)
- Max. depth: 112 feet (34 m)
- Water volume: 1,093,600 acres (442,600 ha)
- Residence time: 207 days
- Shore length^{1}: 520 miles (840 km)
- Surface elevation: 760 feet (230 m)
- Islands: Many (Near 60)
- Settlements: Lake Norman of Catawba, Davidson, Cornelius, Westport
- ^{1} Shore length is not a well-defined measure.

Lake Norman (LKN) is an artificial freshwater lake located in southwestern North Carolina, approximately 15 miles (24 km) north of Charlotte. Created between 1959 and 1964 during the construction of Cowans Ford Dam by Duke Energy, it is the largest man-made body of freshwater located entirely within North Carolina. The lake is named after former Duke Power president Norman Atwater Cocke.

Spanning over 50 square miles (130 km^{2}) with 520 miles (840 km) of shoreline, Lake Norman borders four North Carolina counties: Catawba, Iredell, Lincoln, and Mecklenburg. Fed by the Catawba River, the reservoir serves as a critical infrastructure hub for the Piedmont region, providing cooling water for the McGuire Nuclear Station and Marshall Steam Station. The water from the lake drives the generators at the hydroelectric station in Cowards Ford Dam, and supplies drinking water to surrounding municipalities.

The creation of the lake submerged historical farmlands, mill towns, and Native American settlement sites associated with the Catawba people. Following the completion of Interstate 77 in the 1970s, the surrounding area gradually transitioned from a rural agricultural district into a rapidly growing suburban corridor. Today, Lake Norman is a major regional center for recreation, supporting sport fishing, boating, and Lake Norman State Park.

== Geography ==
Lake Norman has 520 miles (840 km) of shoreline and a surface area of more than 50 square miles (130 km^{2}). It is fed by the Catawba River, and drains into Mountain Island Lake to the south. Named after former Duke Power president Norman Atwater Cocke, the lake is sometimes referred to as the "inland sea" of North Carolina. Its normal full level is 760 feet (230 m) above mean sea level. Interstate 77 and North Carolina Highway 150 cross Lake Norman at different points.

== History ==
=== Catawba history ===
Long before the Catawba River was dammed in 1963 to create Lake Norman, the river and surrounding area were home to the Catawba people of North Carolina. Now with a reservation in Rock Hill, South Carolina, this Indian nation lived along the Catawba River for 6,000 years.

The Catawba River has long been a part of the historical narrative of settlers, as its presence provided sites with water and key cartographic information for traveling. Figure 1 illustrates a map drawn in 1775 by Henry Mouzon of North and South Carolina, in which the Catawba River and other natural features are detailed in full. For comparison, Figure 2 depicts a map of North Carolina from 1958, only a few years before the creation of Lake Norman. When placed together, one can visualize the importance of this location over the last few centuries. The 18th century map's cartographer took painstaking effort in accurately portraying the topographic facets of the landscape, while maintaining an overarching emphasis on the counties, towns, and indigenous frontiers throughout. The 20th century map shows similar details, with slight changes in the Catawba River's course—much of which can be accounted for by natural processes, such as erosion or cutoff.

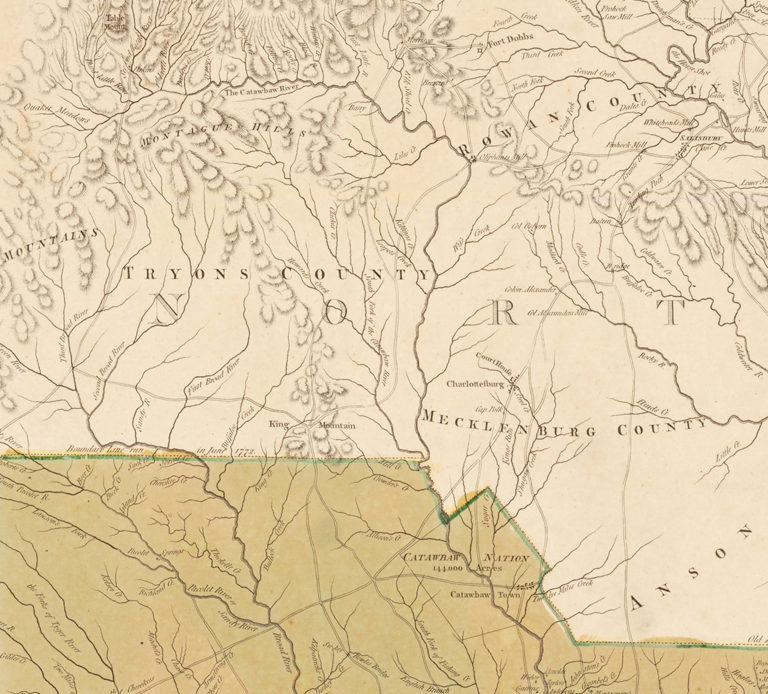
Figure 1: "An Accurate Map of North and South Carolina"; 1775; Henry Mouzon. Archived by Davidson College.

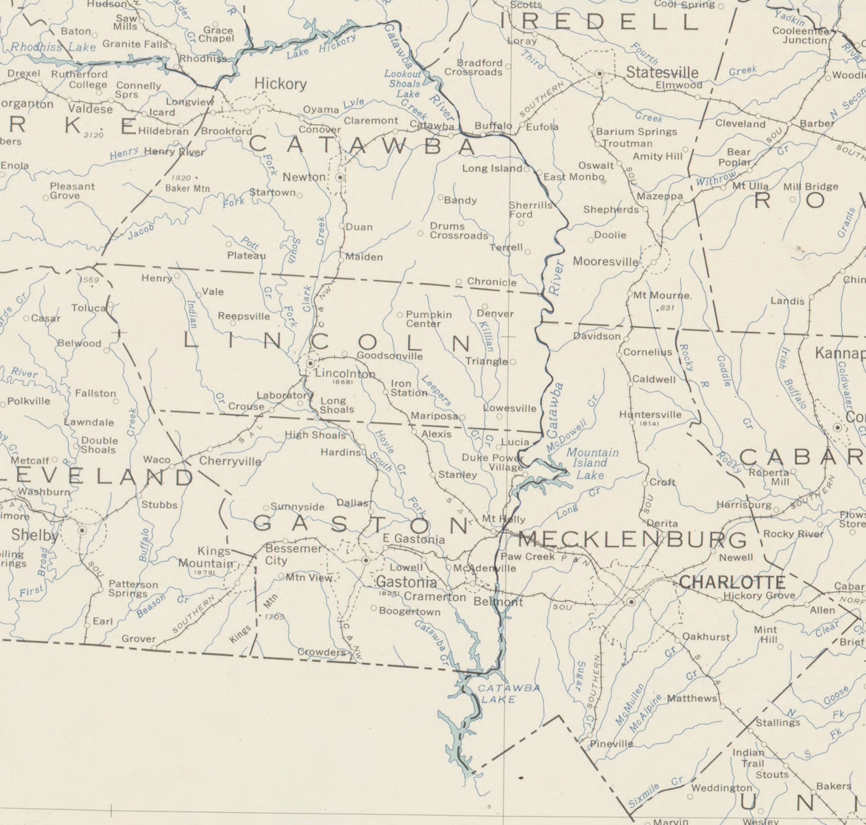
Figure 2: "State of North Carolina"; 1958; U.S. Geological Survey. Archived by the University of North Carolina at Chapel Hill.

Because of the river's desirability and the overarching push toward American colonialism, settlers in the 18th and 19th centuries fought over these lands with indigenous peoples. The removal of Native Americans from the Southeast is well-documented, especially with the plight of the Cherokee Nation through their journey on the Trail of Tears. The Catawba people faced a similar struggle, as they attempted to preserve their own culture while maintaining alliances with the Cherokee and other tribes. Although the process of removal had begun earlier, emphasized in the 1700s with the rise of slavery and cotton agriculture, the 1840 Nations Ford Treaty ceded Catawba land to South Carolina and provided in return "three hundred acres of which is to be good arable lands, fit for cultivation, to be purchased in Haywood County, North Carolina, or in some other mountainous or thinly populated region." In a letter sent by North Carolina Governor John Motley Morehead in 1841, he "refused to accept the Catawba" and "sarcastically proposed that the North Carolina Cherokee should instead settle themselves in South Carolina." Such sentiments proved common during this period, as in 1847 the governor of South Carolina, David Johnson, remarked, "They [the Catawba] are, in effect, dissolved."

Accordingly, although the Catawba were effectively displaced from today's Lake Norman region, their namesake and artifacts remain. Considering the long-time historical presence of the Catawba, it follows that some pieces of their material culture would exist underneath the now flooded region of Lake Norman. Pottery, for example, is considered a "cultural legacy" to the Catawba, and was traditionally "dug from clay holes along the banks of the Catawba River." Other artifacts may include tobacco pipes, gun parts, glass beads, and nose bangles. Before the influence of firearms through trading, arrows were also used; these arrowheads today are now considered prized collector's pieces. Today, archeologists are still finding new sites where the Catawba and other Native Americans lived. Further up the river in Morganton, past the dams built by Duke Energy, a 500-year old village was discovered in 2012. Research on the Catawba's presence in the Carolinas continues to be a long-term effort for archaeologists and historians alike, as seen in the "Catawba Project" run by UNC Chapel Hill. Similar places and archaeological remains likely exist beneath the waves of the lake, sitting alongside the farmlands, cemeteries, and other physical remnants predating the 1960s.

=== Before the lake ===
The construction of the Cowan's Ford Dam and the subsequent creation of Lake Norman in the late 1950s and early 1960s represented just one part of a larger hydroelectric project on the Catawba River, dating back to the early 1900s. Furthermore, it fits into the larger context of river manipulation and the "energy-water nexus" that developed in the U.S. South in the early to mid-1900s. Over the course of the twentieth century, public and private entities across the U.S. South sought water management solutions for two primary purposes: environmental control—limiting flooding and drought—and electric power production.

In 1900, Walker Gill Wylie and Robert H. Wylie formed the Catawba Power Company, which was purchased by the Duke brothers upon the completion of the construction of its first power station in 1904. Throughout the early 1900s, the Duke Power Company sought to build a market for hydroelectric power and develop an interconnected hydroelectric system, rather than "random development of isolated sites." While Duke Energy's permit to construct the Cowan's Ford Dam was not obtained until 1958, the company's "plans for the project date back to 1904." As part of its project to expand demand for electricity, the Duke Power Company invested in textile mills throughout the region. By 1928, the Catawba River system was nicknamed "the world's most electrified river", with ten dams and dozens of powerhouses dispersed up and down the river.

On August 25, 1957, The Charlotte Observer reported Duke Power Company's proposal to build the Cowan's Ford Lake, "the latest (and last) of Duke Power Co.'s dammed-up creatures of the Catawba." In the article announcing the company's plan, the Charlotte Observer framed the infrastructure project largely in terms of hydroelectric power and recreation opportunities, declaring that the dam would create "a whopping charge of electrical energy for Duke and a new sportsman's playground for water-wacky Carolinians."

In a 1959 meeting at the Statesville Kiwanis Club, Duke Energy representative Bill Ward explained that the primary motivation behind the construction of the Cowan's Ford Dam was to provide "power for peak load periods." Unlike the steam-generated power plants Duke had already constructed in the area, the Cowan's Ford Dam would include "water-driven turbines" that could easily be started and stopped to control energy generation. The creation of the dam was therefore an opportunity for Duke Energy to increase its market share in the textile industry, which was transitioning production from "steam-generated power to electricity."

However, this was not the only ambition behind the project. In a 1959 publication of the Statesville Record & Landmark, home-sites that would soon become lakefront properties were being advertised by Duke Energy to potential customers. Furthermore, the company discussed its goal of bringing new industry to the area surrounding the soon-to-be lake. While these plans provided future economic stimulus for the surrounding area, they also marked a distinct shift from the industry and communities that were currently residing in the path of the impending flood.

The local newspaper record from the late 1950s and early 1960s showed little concern for the land and communities that would be flooded and displaced due to the creation of Lake Norman. According to the Charlotte Observer, the land that would be flooded was 70% timberland and "most property to be submerged...[was] already owned by Duke." In anticipation of the flooding after the completion of the dam, Duke Power employed forester Carl Blades to purchase land from "reluctant farmers". He ultimately purchased 30,000 acres (120 km^{2}) of "family farmland" that would end up submerged. Because Lake Norman was anticipated to be relatively shallow, Duke had to "scrub the land clean of trees, homes, and other debris" to "remove underwater hazards." Those individuals who would be displaced were often hesitant, but "there weren't any huge protests." Some residents even "turned the burden" of the new lake "into a boon." A number of farmers benefited by holding on to what would soon become expensive lakefront property, while other residents refused to sell to Duke Energy and as a result leased their water rights to the company.

The project to construct Cowan's Ford Dam broke ground in 1959. Upon the dam's completion in 1962, the lake began to fill with water. After the construction of dam, the Catawba River slowly covered the 30,000 acres of land where farms, mills, plantations, and entire communities once resided. Historic sites, such as the battlefield for the Revolutionary War Battle of Cowan's Ford, were also flooded during the creation of Lake Norman.

The mill towns of East Monbo and Long Island closed in 1959 and 1961, respectively, in anticipation of the formation of the lake. Situated on the banks of the Catawba River, the mills were extremely at risk of inundation. The proposal for Lake Norman and Cowan's Ford Dam had brought uncertainty to the "community of oldtimers" living in these mill towns. In a segment titled "Where will the lake come?", Douglas Eisele of the Statesville Record and Landmark remarked on the mill communities' public memory of earlier flooding and resilience, writing: "will man's ingenuity finally take down what two historic floods could not destroy?" While the foundations of the mill towns' building remain beneath the lake, some families moved their houses outside the range of the lake flooding.

Furthermore, several cemeteries, such as the Caldwell Family Cemetery and Flemming Family Cemetery, are now covered by the lake. Duke Energy tracked down family members of those buried in the surrounding cemeteries to determine how the graves should be handled before the flood. Many individuals asked for the gravestones to be transported to a new location and Duke ensured the markers were "cleaned and repaired" once they were moved.

Duke Power partnered with the state of North Carolina to establish Lake Norman State Park. It has also built two bank fishing areas and eight public boating access areas along the shoreline. One site is leased to Mecklenburg County and one to Iredell County. Game fish in Lake Norman include catfish, crappie, bluegill and yellow perch, as well as striped, largemouth, spotted, white bass hybrids, and long-nosed gar. Lake Norman has also become home to multiple species of wildlife, including eastern box turtle, soft shell turtle, snapping turtle, black (eastern) rat snake and the Northern water snake.

=== Naming ===
Lake Norman was named after Norman Atwater Cocke, former president of Duke Energy. Cocke was born on November 20, 1884, to James Cocke and Sarah Atwater in Prince George County, Virginia. A graduate of New York Law School, he began his career with Duke Energy in 1906 as an attorney, becoming a Vice President and director of the company in 1927. Cocke was president of Duke Energy from 1947 to 1959. Under his leadership, Duke Energy representatives spent a great deal of time planning the new lake, convincing locals to leave the future lakebed, and working with state officials to get support for the project. Cocke would also communicate with Davidson College in order to establish a satellite location for the college along the shores of the future lake. In 1960, Duke Energy stated that the lake would be named in Norman's honor, as he had retired as president of Duke Energy during the previous year.

=== Creation ===
Duke Power's plans to construct Lake Norman began in 1904. The Old Catawba Station Dam marked the beginning of the sixty-year process of Lake Norman's creation. By 1928, Duke Power, then known as Southern Power, had created over ten dams along the river, with the intended goal of using these dams to become the electrical supplier of the whole region. Throughout this time, Duke Power began purchasing land along the Catawba River to minimize the number of people required to move once the Dam flooded the land. The Cowan's Ford site was chosen to build the dam that would complete the sixty-year project. To create the dam and Lake Norman itself, Duke Power required a project license. A project license required the approval of town halls across the areas affected by the transformation of the river. To demonstrate the effect of the lake, Duke Power created a map detailing the areas facing consequences from Lake Norman. Stemming mainly from the lake's commercial aspects, Duke Power was granted the license in 1957 by the Federal Power Commission, despite some resistance due to the historical landmarks that would be submerged by the lake. Along with the project license, Duke Power received permission to clear over 23,000 acres of vegetation in places affected by the flooding. While Duke's purchasing of a large portion of the land helped minimize the damage to communities, many faced relocation. Construction began in 1959 with an address from Governor Hodges and an honorary flipping of the first dynamite switch. Construction of the dam finished in 1962, and along with-it Lake Norman, encompassing over 33,000 acres and 750 miles of shoreline, was created.

=== Long Sam ===
The objective for a couple of local reporters and a photographer was simply to find a spot along the lake to observe and investigate the new Duke Power Lake. Amongst the dense forest surrounding the lake, they saw something unexpected. They found a girl, described as "a statuesque young girl carved from the classical patterns of a Greek Goddess." In the Tom McKnight article for the Charlotte Observer, August 4, 1957, the men who find her describe the odd circumstances in which they stumbled upon her. Sam Fletcher described her as "A second Ava Gardener if one ever lived." The description of her in the Observer called her "primitive and savage" in her beauty. A second column in the Observer, by Gary Davis, describes her as "a fairy tale, only real" and dubs her The Girl in Black. The comparisons for her didn't stop there, when the newest nickname emerged: Long Sam. Long Sam was a girl featured in a newspaper comic in the mid-50s that illustrated a "country bumpkin" placed in a "non-bumpkin" world. The comparison of this woman to Long Sam was found to be due to her beauty and also the perception they had of her as a southern girl. The young woman was named Jimmy, but due to one of her brothers being named Jim, she is now called Dorothy, Dorothy Brown. What she wanted more than anything was a high school education. She said, "You can't be anybody without a high school education." Here the contrast between her and the caricature can be seen, she is not some naïve girl but rather someone striving for being someone greater. Her goal was striving to be somebody, and she believed the path was an education. The column caught national attention with the Associated Press releasing article with titles like "the Backwoods Beauty", "Nature Girl" and "Long Sam." Dorothy Brown, the girl in the photograph, became a national sensation. She was invited to New York City by Ed Sullivan and made the trip with the photographer and writer of the original article. Life magazine called her a "living doll" and "Carolina prototype for Long Sam, heroine of the Al Capp cartoon." Ultimately Dorothy took the $1000 from her appearance on Ed Sullivan and returned. She took the opportunity for education and graduated with a degree in education from the Woman's College of the University of North Carolina. McKnight and Davis said, "If she hadn't been by the well that day, if Duke Power hadn't planned the lake; who's to say what would have happened." The photograph captured a sweet, young girl who just wanted an education. After her fade from the limelight, she ultimately achieved her dreams. This story was all possible because of the development of the lake.

== Hydroelectric power ==
Lake Norman provides electricity to the Piedmont region of the Carolinas. It powers the generators at the hydroelectric station at Cowans Ford Dam, is used by the coal-fired Marshall Steam Station, and by McGuire Nuclear Station to cool the reactors while generating the steam that drives their turbines. The lake supplies water to Lincoln County, Catawba County, Iredell County, Charlotte, and other towns in Mecklenburg County, particularly Cornelius, Davidson and Huntersville.

== Climate ==
Like most of North Carolina, Lake Norman has a humid subtropical climate (Cfa) according to the Köppen climate classification, featuring warm-to-hot summers and cold-to-mild winters. There is no distinct dry season, and precipitation is highly variable year-round. Lake Norman gets a mean annual precipitation of about 43.1 inches (1,090 mm) of precipitation annually, spread out over about 75 days. Approximately 41.1 inches (1,040 mm) fall as rain, while the other 2 inches (51 mm) fall as snow. Average wind speeds are found to be highest in February and lowest in August.

Lake Norman borders four counties in North Carolina (Catawba, Iredell, Mecklenburg, and Lincoln) and is present in both the Southern Piedmont and Central Piedmont climate divisions. July is normally the warmest month in these two climate divisions, with an average daily maximum temperature of 90 °F (32 °C) and an average daily minimum of 70 °F (21 °C). January is normally the coolest month, with an average daily maximum of 51 °F (11 °C) and an average daily minimum of 29 °F (−2 °C). The all-time maximum of 107 °F (42 °C) was recorded in 1954, while the all-time minimum of −5 °F (−21 °C) was recorded in 1985.

Climate data for Lake Norman, North Carolina (elevation 760 feet (230 m))
Month	Jan	Feb	Mar	Apr	May	Jun	Jul	Aug	Sep	Oct	Nov	Dec	Year
Record high °F (°C)	79 (26)	81 (27)	88 (31)	92 (33)	99 (37)	107 (42)	106 (41)	104 (40)	101 (38)	95 (35)	85 (29)	80 (27)	107 (42)
Mean daily maximum °F (°C)	51 (11)	56 (13)	64 (18)	72 (22)	80 (27)	87 (31)	90 (32)	88 (31)	82 (28)	73 (23)	63 (17)	54 (12)	90 (32)
Mean daily minimum °F (°C)	29 (−2)	32 (0)	39 (4)	48 (9)	57 (14)	66 (19)	70 (21)	68 (20)	62 (17)	49 (9)	40 (4)	32 (0)	29 (−2)
Record low °F (°C)	−5 (−21)	−4 (−20)	−1 (−18)	25 (−4)	31 (−1)	40 (4)	54 (12)	49 (9)	34 (1)	25 (−4)	11 (−12)	3 (−16)	−5 (−21)
Average precipitation inches (mm)	3.85 (98)	3.66 (93)	3.71 (94)	2.85 (72)	2.99 (76)	3.99 (101)	3.48 (88)	4.45 (113)	3.66 (93)	3.86 (98)	3.06 (78)	3.54 (90)	43.1 (1,090)
Source: The Weather Channel

Lake Norman Map Northern Portion01/17/2016

Lake Norman Map Southern Portion 01/17/2016

== Geology ==
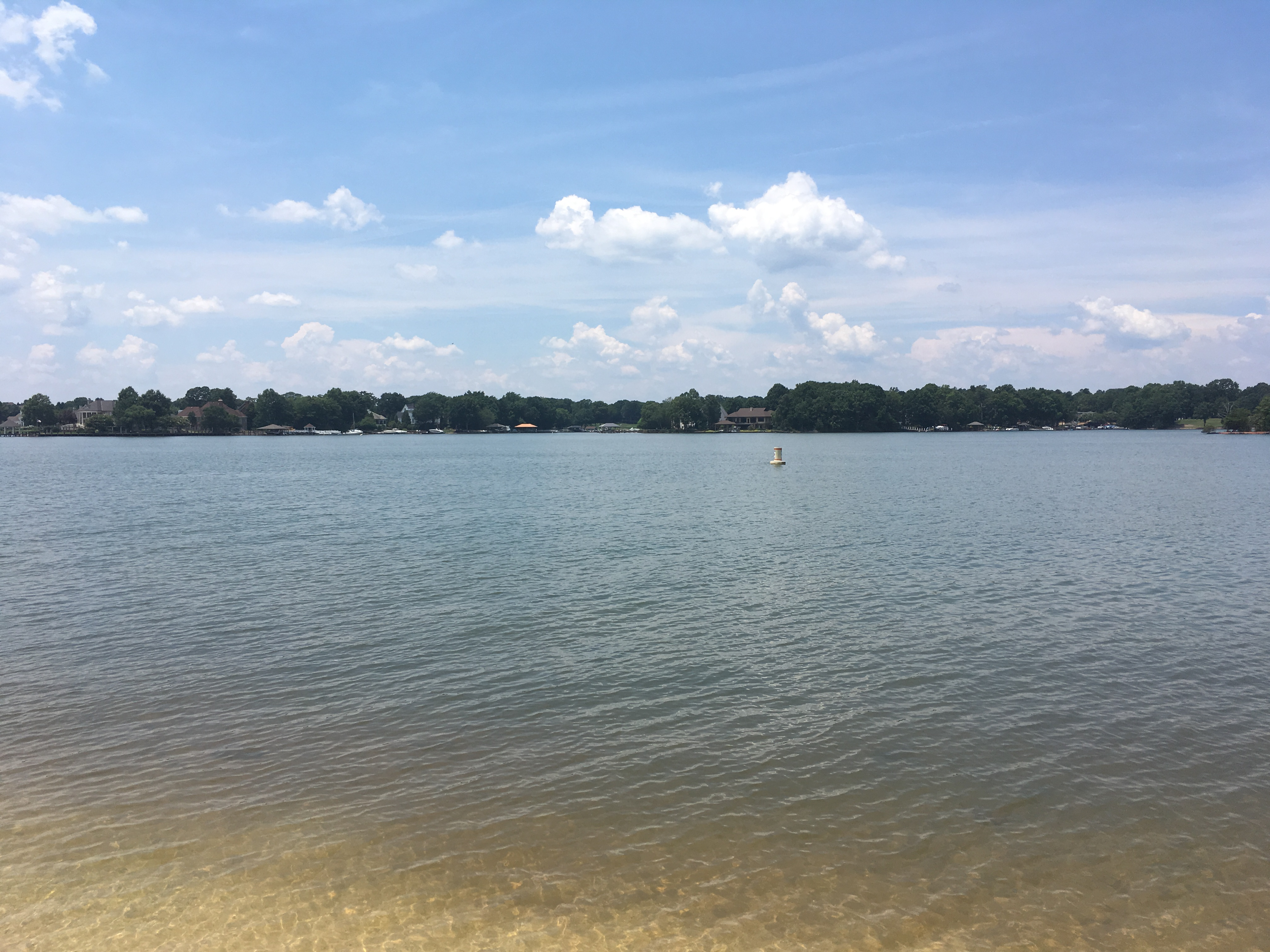
Lake Norman in Ramsey Creek Park in Cornelius

Lake Norman is a man-made lake that is 33.6 miles (54.1 km) long, 9 miles (14 km) wide, and has 520 miles (840 km) of shoreline. Its average depth is 33.5 feet (10.2 m), but at its outlet it reaches a depth of 110 feet (34 m). The lake is mainly underlain by interfingered igneous and metamorphic bedrock.

The bottom of the lake consists of various clay and plastic soils. These mechanically engineered soils are maintained and constructed with artificial enforcing, which adds a stabilization factor, and solidifies the lake so it will not break down and wear away. Clay soil contains a high percentage of particles that becomes sticky when wet, and therefore holds together better.

Lake Norman lies atop two geologic belts, the Charlotte belt and the Inner Piedmont belt. The Charlotte belt is made up of igneous rock that is 300 to 500 million years old. Igneous rocks are used in construction, which is why the lake was built on top of them. The Inner Piedmont belt is the most metamorphosed belt, and contains deformed metamorphosed volcanic and sedimentary rocks approximately 500 to 700 million years old. The lake is built on the Catawba River, and is underlain by inceptisol soils, which are found in river floodplains. The soil is made of brown forest soil deposits and includes a wide variety of dissimilar soil characteristics. In North Carolina, inceptisols cover almost the whole state, except areas around the east coast.

=== Erosion ===
The main cause of erosion issues on Lake Norman is the density of residential neighborhoods located so close to the shorelines of the lake. Since Lake Norman is well known for its recreational activities, there is a continuously high demand for real estate on Lake Norman. Stormwater runoff plays the largest role in erosion issues due to the amount of impervious surfaces from dense development.

When Davidson College was in the process of purchasing property along Lake Norman and finalizing plans for its lake campus, many assessments were conducted to analyze the quality of the land and quality of dams feeding into the lake. Initially a report completed in 1990 by Dr. Joe A. Edmisten, an ecological consultant, concluded that there was evidence of erosion in Wetland #1 of the report due to the level of urbanization in the area. In addition, in the preliminary examination of the dam on Concord Road in 1990, researchers found that it was necessary to implement "two erosion control basins at the primary drainage points" on the Davidson property to avoid future erosion issues. All erosion efforts on and around Davidson's property were noted in two reports, one in March 1992 and the other in June 1992, that they were going to be maintained by the Mecklenburg County Guidelines and Specifications for Soil Erosion and Sediment Control.

Currently, regulations enforced by the state of North Carolina are intended to prevent erosion issues and preserve the lake and the land surrounding it. A regulation established on June 30, 2001, states that there must be a 50-foot buffer zone between the lake and new housing where vegetation is required to be preserved. Older neighborhoods that were already in place at the time the regulation was created were grandfathered into the previous 30-foot buffer zone regulation. Officials from the North Carolina Division of Water Quality state that "vegetation stabilizes river banks, prevents soil from eroding into water and filters storm water runoff."

== Water quality ==
Coal ash contamination from Duke Energy's power plant continues to be a major concern to residents around the lake. A report run by Duke Energy issued a 20,000-page report in 2018, the data confirms that "levels of radium in groundwater far exceed EPA drinking water standards", and "could clearly harm those who use this water for drinking".

Though there are few recent documented reports containing data about the current water quality of Lake Norman, data from previous years can help estimate the current specifics of the water quality. "Duke Energy [also] routinely monitors the water quality of Lake Norman as a requirement of the NPDES permit from the McGuire Nuclear Station," and there have been "no obvious short-term or long-term impacts of the nuclear station" where data samples were taken. Periodically reports from Duke Energy will be released updating the public on status of the quality of both water from the lake and groundwater sources.

There are two public water quality reports from different sources that were conducted in 2007. They help paint a picture of what the water quality of the lake was like in the past and what it is currently like. The first sample series included a variety of sample collections from different areas of the lake. In a sample series where five different lakes along the Catawba Chain were analyzed and compared, researchers noted that "Lake Norman [had] some of the best water quality of the five lakes sampled within the chain." In the report, nine samples of water were taken at eight stations within the lake, and none of the samples violated any of the local water quality standards. Specifically, the report found each of the following when analyzing the samples:

- Low levels of organic nitrogen
- Elevated levels of inorganic nitrogen (most likely due to drought conditions of the lake at the time of the report)
- Total phosphorus levels below the state Division of Water Quality laboratory detections
- All other parameters were normal

Overall, this report concluded that the water quality of Lake Norman was within standard parameters.

A second report conducted in 2007 found similar results as the previous report. In this one, Lake Norman was monitored by Division of Water Quality staff once a month from May to September. The mean Secchi depths of this report ranged from 1.8 to 2.6 meters (5.9 to 8.5 ft), which indicates good water quality. Specifics on the water quality itself from the report include the following:

- Low turbidity values
- Total phosphorus levels below Division of Water Quality detection levels in all areas except the most upstream sampling site
- Low ammonia levels
- Low total organic nitrogen levels
- Elevated levels of nitrite and nitrate concentrations
- Chlorophyll a ranged from low to moderate

The similarities between the two reports indicate consistent and reliable data analysis on Lake Norman. These reports, along with routine updates from Duke Energy, will help researchers to continue to document and monitor the water quality of Lake Norman in the future.

The Lake's specific trophic status varies depending on the water-quality indicator used. Phosphorus concentrations in Lake Norman have been associated with an oligotrophic classification, while chlorophyll a concentrations have indicated a mesotrophic classification. These differing classifications reflect the use of different indicators to assess the lakes nutrient levels and biological productivity.

Duke Energy has a permit to dump wastewater into an upstream section of the river as long as the water the company extracts from the lake is of the same quality as the water being dumped into the lake. Duke Energy has been making some improvements when it comes to the amount of wastewater being distributed into the lake. However, 500,000 gallons of sewage was dumped into the lake, according to a report by the Catawba Riverkeeper Foundation in May 2004. Efforts were taken to ensure that the overall water quality of the lake does not decline as a direct cause of wastewater entering the lake.

== Ecology ==
North Carolina's Piedmont is a region of high biodiversity, and Lake Norman is important for its diversity of birds, fish, mammals and plants. Lake Norman is the largest body of water in the Catawba River watershed and the largest lake in North Carolina. Lake Norman's surrounding ecology includes mesic mixed hardwood forest, dry oak-hickory forest, dry-mesic oak-hickory forest, Piedmont bottomland forest and Piedmont alluvial forest.

=== Fauna ===
Fish populations are an important ecological actor in Lake Norman. Recreational sportfishing has supplanted subsistence and commercial fishing as the main mode of fishing on the lake. Many of the fish were artificially introduced by fishing clubs and organizations. The fish population is quite diverse, including but not limited to:

- Black bullhead
- Blue catfish
- Bluegill
- Channel catfish
- Crappie
- Flathead catfish
- Largemouth bass
- Sauger
- Smallmouth bass
- Spotted bass
- Striped bass

The striped bass has historically been one of Lake Norman's most popular sport fish. Stripers tend to dwell in the lake's shallow shoreline during the spring and in deeper waters during the summer. There has been a change in bass to form hybrid species as a result of artificial stocking practices. The North Carolina Wildlife Resources Commission (NCWRC) introduced the striped bass in 1969 because they were once the dominant open water fish in Lake Norman. However, the striped bass population declined quickly, prompting the NCWRC to discontinue the stocking program in 2012.

- Walleye
- White bass
- Yellow perch
- Yellowfin bream

The basin is also home to a large variety of animal residents, many of them unique and rare to the Piedmont area and which thrive off of the resources provided by Lake Norman. The list includes:

- Crayfish
- Dragonfly
- Heelsplitter — The federally endangered Carolina heelsplitter, a freshwater mussel, is sensitive to changes in water quality. Some Carolina heelsplitter populations have been reduced to a few dozen mussels. Sediment pollution is a culprit in the mussel's decline. There are only three populations in North Carolina and 10 total populations in the world of this sharp-edged mollusk, which grows to only about 4 inches (100 mm) long.

There are many mammal species that have inhabited the Piedmont region for a long period of time before Lake Norman was created. The mammals that inhabit the Lake Norman area include:

- Beaver
- Coyote
- Eastern cottontail
- Eastern gray squirrel
- Eastern mole
- Muskrat
- Raccoon
- Virginia opossum
- White-tailed deer

Populations of reptiles and amphibians have found resource-filled and safe dwelling locations around the Lake Norman ecosystem. Many of the reptiles and amphibians inhabit the perimeter of Lake Norman. These include:

- Frogs
- Turtles
- Water snakes

Most of the snakes found around the perimeter of Lake Norman are harmless and seldom seen. However, one must be aware of the presence of the venomous Eastern copperhead, which can severely harm a human with a single bite

Birds and waterfowl are also important ecological actors that contribute to the overall health and balance of the Lake Norman ecosystem. Of a total of 115 bird species, 54 species are neotropical migrants and 27 were transients to the North Carolina Piedmont. The Catawba River is a suitable migratory corridor for a variety of these birds. There are also 19 species of shorebirds that have been recorded as dwelling around the Catawba River.

Below is a list of birds that can be found in the greater Lake Norman area (including waterfowl):

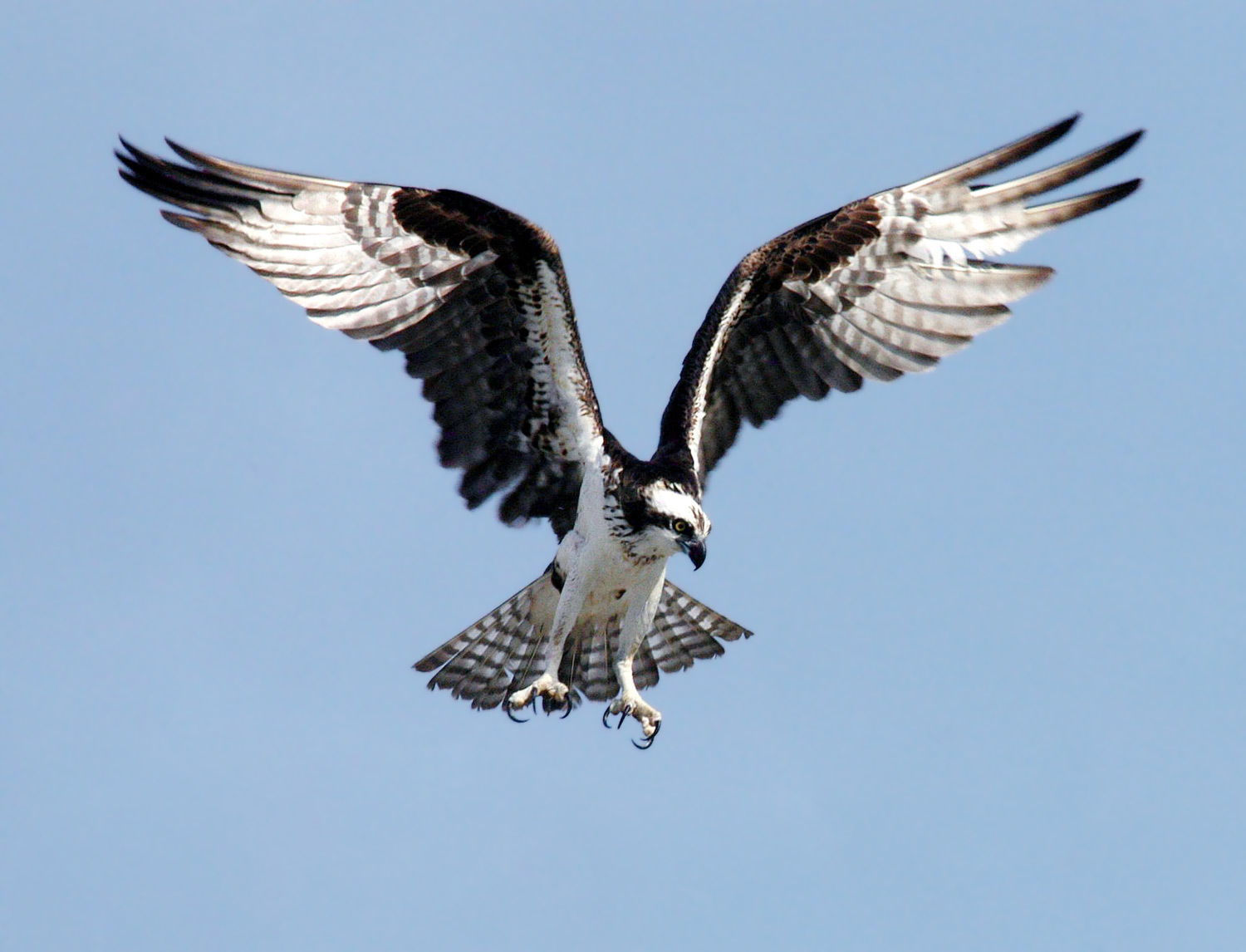
A wild osprey spreads its wings.

- American coot
- American crow
- American robin
- Bald eagle
- Belted kingfisher
- Black swan
- Black vulture
- Blue grosbeak
- Brown thrasher
- Brown-headed cowbird
- Canada goose
- Cattle egret
- Cedar waxwing
- Chuck-will's-widow
- Common grackle
- Common raven
- Dark-eyed junco
- Eastern bluebird
- Eastern kingbird
- Eastern towhee
- Field sparrow
- Great blue heron
- Great egret
- House finch
- Killdeer
- Mallard
- Mourning dove
- Mute swan
- Northern cardinal
- Osprey
- Red-bellied woodpecker
- Red-tailed hawk
- Red-winged blackbird
- Ring-billed gull
- Turkey vulture
- White ibis
- White-throated sparrow
- Yellow-breasted chat

=== Flora ===
Many native plants found around Lake Norman are also common in other parts of North Carolina, such as trees and flowering plants.

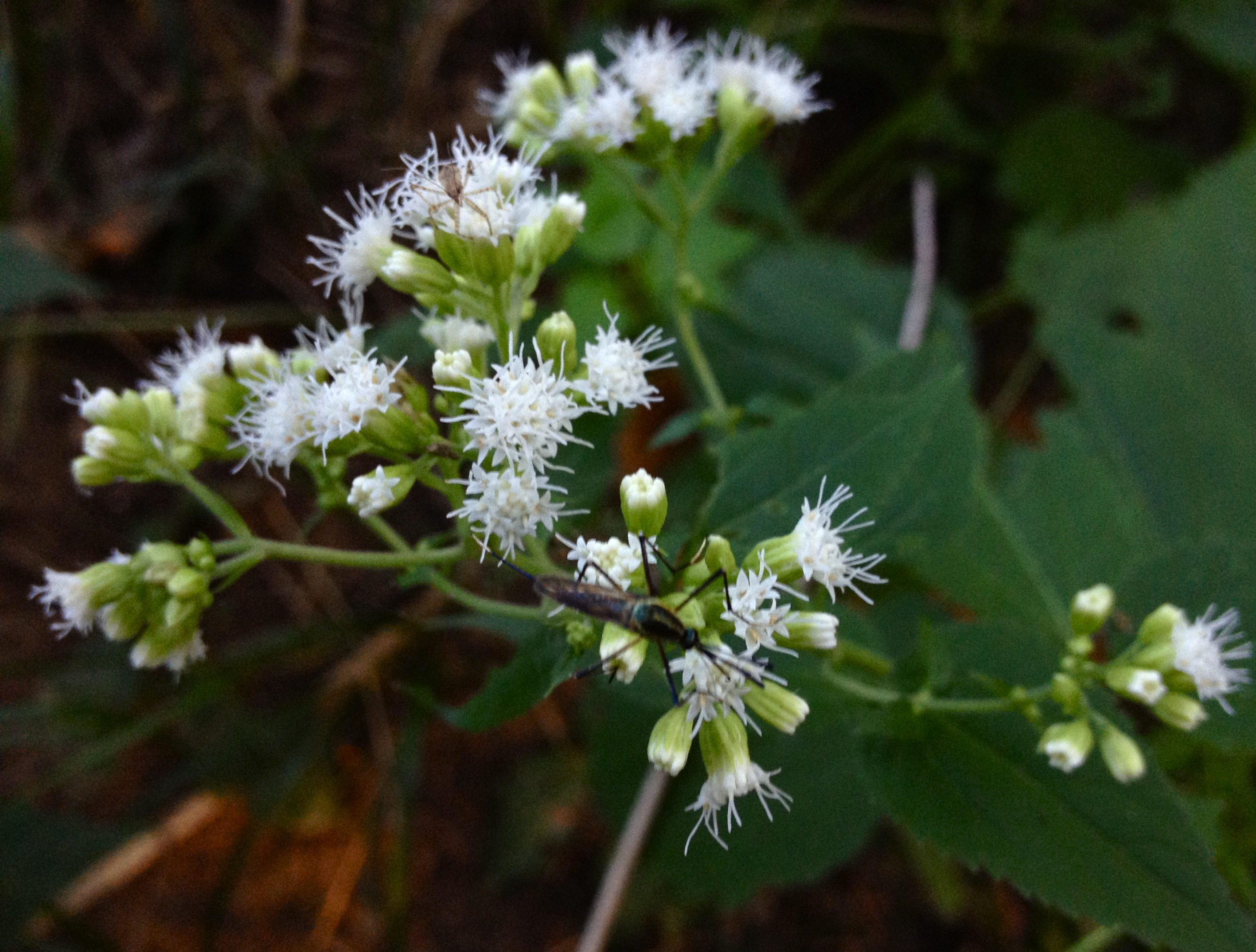
White snakeroot

Many different trees are found in and around Lake Norman. Species of the genus Baccharis L. are typically found in warm and subtropical regions of the United States. One such species of this genus, Silverling, reaches tree size and is native to North Carolina. It is most common in marshes and areas with moist soil. Another species of plant typically found in areas with moist soil and riverbanks is known as hornbeam or ironwood. Belonging to the genus Carpinus L. and native to North Carolina, it is a type of beech tree known for its heavy and hard wood, resulting in the name ironwood. Another tree native to North Carolina and found in and around Lake Norman is the yellow poplar or tulip poplar, which is commonly found in forests with moist soil and floodplains. Also found in and around Lake Norman is sassafras, often located in temperate climates and native to North Carolina.

Many flowering plants are also found around the lake, including Indian mallow. Also found in the vicinity of the lake is baneberry, a part of the Ranunculacease (buttercup) family. Another flowering plant found around the lake is white snakeroot (Ageratina altissima). It is a perennial herb and is poisonous, containing tremetol, a type of toxic alcohol. In addition, stork's-bill or herons-bill is found around Lake Norman and serves as food for some small mammals.

== Environmental management of the lake ==
Lake Norman and the surrounding shoreline serve as a habitat for a diverse array of plants and wildlife, as well as a place for a myriad of human activities. Maintaining this habitat to simultaneously preserve endangered species, keep invasive species at bay, and maintain health and safety standards for the people that live, work, and recreate on the lake is an arduous undertaking. The management of the lake is complicated by the presence of multiple stakeholders in the lake's management, often with conflicting interests and priorities. Duke Energy owns most of the land underneath Lake Norman, as well as the land above the lake up to an elevation of 232 metres (761 ft), with the exception of land platted to other ownership. Certain lakebed portions are owned by families that settled on the banks of the Catawba River prior to the flooding of Norman. Those families allowed Duke Energy to flood their properties, yet the lakebed still remains property of these families. Duke Energy is in charge of management of the lake itself as well as any property, such as lake walls, docks, and beaches, that enter into this zone. The land that falls under the jurisdiction of Duke Energy is subject to the ordinances of the Federal Energy Regulatory Commission, while the land surrounding the lake, both publicly and privately owned, is subject to the ordinances of the state of North Carolina and the county in which the land falls (Catawba County, Iredell County, Lincoln County, or Mecklenburg County). Additionally, the Lake Norman Marine Commission and the North Carolina Wildlife Resources Commission, as well as many non-governmental organizations and environmental organizations, play roles in the regulation and management of the lake. Environmental duties are divided between these different stakeholders, but some fall under split jurisdiction. Water quality, for example, is monitored and managed by both Duke Energy and the state of North Carolina. Other partnerships are voluntary: Duke Energy, for example, partners with many wildlife organizations to minimize the impact of human activities on the environment.

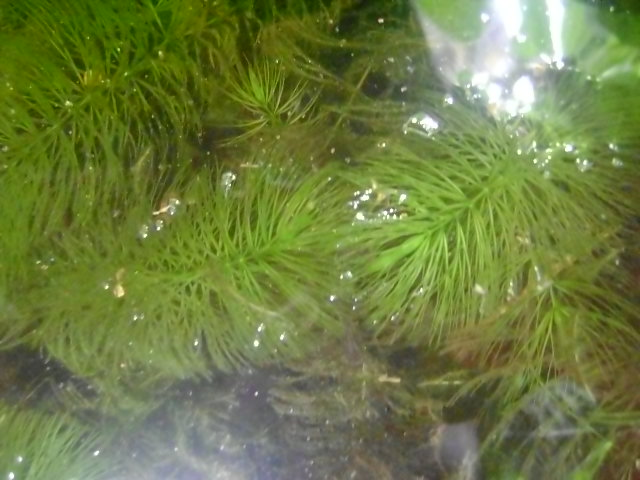
Hydrilla verticillata

The management of the invasive plant Hydrilla (Hydrilla verticillata) has been a particularly challenging undertaking for these stakeholders. Hydrilla, native to India, was introduced to the United States in the 1950s, and was first seen in Lake Norman in 2001. Hydrilla was likely transported to Lake Norman on the beds and motor blades of boats transported from infected lakes. Hydrilla crowds out native species, impedes irrigation, and clogs boat motors. When Hydrilla first takes hold, there is an initial upsurge in fish populations, as bait fish, which form a vital link in the food chain, flourish in Hydrilla, but as the infestation grows too thick, it chokes out other plants and fish, who get caught in the weeds, and cannot swim. Hydrilla also has a harmful impact on bird populations. It contains a harmful bacterium that acts as a neurotoxin for some birds. In Lake Norman, these bacteria cause sickness in coot, who eat the Hydrilla, as well as in eagles, who eat coot. The Lake Norman Marine Commission sought to keep the Hydrilla population in Lake Norman at bay by introducing grass carp that feed on the aquatic plants.

A study conducted in 2014 by Kirk, Manuel, and Lemprecht examined this use of triploid grass carp to control the invasive aquatic plant. By 2004, approximately 6120 triploid grass carp has been introduced into the Lake. When reviewing the results, the researchers found that although the triploid grass carp did not thrive in the Lake, they effectively reduced the Hydrilla coverage in LKN to less than 1%. The findings demonstrate the use of biological management control to protect the native plant and animal life from invasive species.

Other environmental management projects on Lake Norman focus their efforts on helping native species. Notably, the Lake Norman Wildlife Conservationists (LNWC), with donations from Duke Energy's Habitat Enhancement Program, began a program in 2014 to promote nesting sites and preserve habitat for great blue herons and osprey. Since then, LNWC and Duke Energy have put up five nesting platforms throughout the lake each year. Additionally, Duke Energy has protected Heron Island and several other islands throughout the lake as a place for great blue herons to raise their young.

== Development ==
=== Local housing ===
Since Lake Norman's creation, housing and real estate in the area have been subject to significant changes. In addition to the appeal of Lake Norman and the many activities and jobs associated with it, the area lies in close proximity to Charlotte – the largest metropolitan area in the Carolinas and the second-largest financial center in the United States after New York City. Given the appeal of the area and the government sponsored push for suburban living in the 1950s, demand for housing rose steeply from the late 1950s to the present. Duke Energy, which owned about 300,000 acres of surplus land, responded to this demand in 1963, as the lake was finally full and open for business. Duke owned half of the Lake Norman shoreline, and the company made about 2,500 cottage sites available for lease at $120 a year. Other private developers began establishing subdivisions like Moonlight Bay, Isle of Pines, Kiser's Island, Bonanza, Westport, and Island Forest, many of which are still residential communities today. Many of the homes built on Lake Norman served as secondary homes for people who lived in the surrounding area, but the appeal of the area extended beyond Lake Norman's immediate vicinity leading to an increase in the number of permanent residents in towns like Davidson, Mooresville, and Cornelius. Many of these towns around Lake Norman developed comprehensive development plans in order to cope with the rapid growth. New Zoning ordinances in Cornelius, Davidson, and Huntersville called for development that would promote pedestrian traffic and accessibility among the three towns.

The construction of I-77 in 1975 complicated the development situation in the area, as it gave people immediate access to all that Lake Norman offered and the surrounding towns. In 1977, a subsidiary of Duke Energy called Crescent Resources began to sell some of Duke's land holdings, which allowed further development on the previously leased land. Based on what had occurred in the area since the creation of Lake Norman, the assumption going forth was that both the economic and population growth would continue creating demand at the lake. In 1980, Mecklenburg county voted against a bond program that would preserve the remaining farmland in the area, demonstrating the transition from an area previously dominated by agricultural land to one that was far more suburban. Today, the four counties that make up the Lake Norman area are some of the fastest growing counties in North Carolina. From 1990 to 2016, the population of the Lake Norman area has grown by 831%. Median home values in towns surrounding Lake Norman are all higher than the national average of $250,800 (Mooresville: $250,800, Davidson: $339,400, Cornelius: $280,000, Huntersville $304,034), and appreciation rates for homes are some of the highest in North Carolina.

=== I-77 ===
The construction of I-77 during the formation of Lake Norman created a quick and efficient way to travel through the lake's surrounding cities and towns, which include Charlotte, Huntersville, Davidson, and Mooresville. Before the creation of the lake, a period often referred to as the "pre-lake days", local residents "often took a back road to Charlotte". Back roads such as Kiser Island Road were able to transport drivers "through cotton fields and great pine forests" as they made their way to their desired location. Other frequently traveled highways before the creation of Lake Norman include N.C. 115 and U.S. 21, which were both used to travel from the area to Charlotte.

26.23 miles of state roads were flooded by the creation of Lake Norman. Duke Power, now Duke Energy, paid North Carolina "$3.3 million to relocate 13.3 miles of roadway and to raise 6.4 miles of roadway". The creation of the lake and the flooding of several "farm-to-market roads" disconnected many previously established communities in Mecklenburg, Iredell, Lincoln, and Catawba counties from one another. The newly filled Lake Norman caused bridges like the highway 150 bridge to be rebuilt, and new roads to be built entirely for the purpose of reconnecting severed communities.

U.S. Highway 21 was partially flooded with the development of Lake Norman, but the portion that was not remained the best way to travel from the surrounding lake areas to Charlotte. The construction of I-77 created an easy way to get into the city. Transportation to and from Charlotte no longer took place on the inconvenient U.S. 21, but instead I-77 provided a smoother commute into Charlotte. The completion of the interstate in 1975 also created an avenue for growth within the surrounding Lake Norman cities shown as housing developments, restaurants, and stores began to grow within the space. With housing developments spreading around the lake, an exclusive nature of the area was also formed. The current size of the surrounding Lake Norman area has removed the easy commute that I-77 originally created. Today I-77 by Lake Norman is known for its traffic rather than its "new convenience".

In response to the heavy traffic of I-77 around Lake Norman, the construction of express lanes began in November 2015. The express lanes will improve traffic flow along 26 miles of I-77 by providing "more reliable travel time... from Brookshire Freeway (Exit 11) in Mecklenburg County to N.C. 150 (Exit 36) Iredell County". The N.C. Department of Transportation contracted the project to I-77 Mobility Partners, a subsidiary of Spain-based contractor, Cintra. The Department of Transportation states that funding the project privately allows the construction and opening of the project to take place much quicker than if funding was provided by the state. Several residents have expressed concerns for the toll lanes as the construction has increased traffic rather than improving it, but the Department of Transportation is confident that the express lanes will improve commute time.

=== Airparks ===
Lake Norman is home to two airparks, Long Island Airpark and Lake Norman Airpark

== Recreation ==
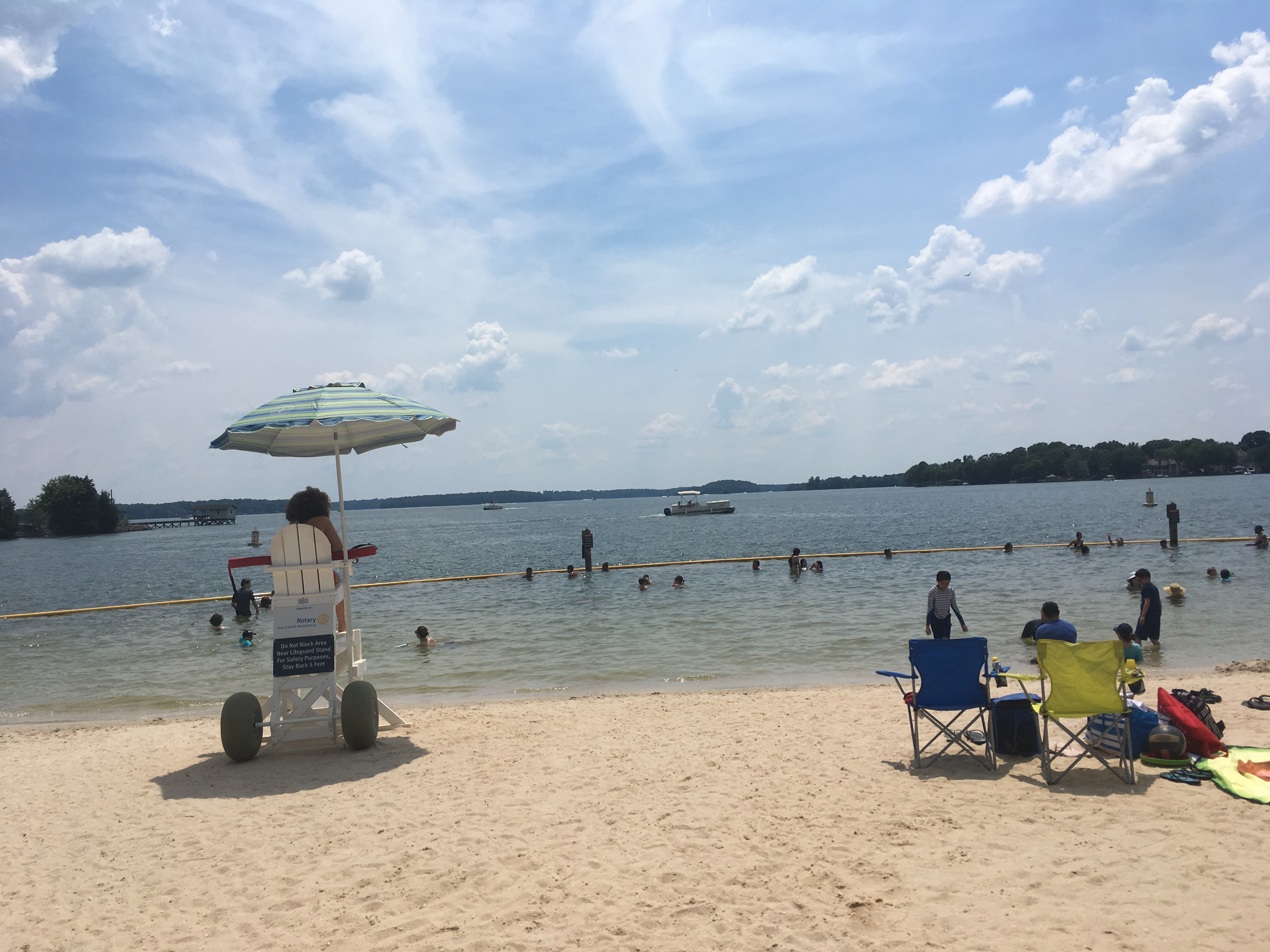
Beach along Lake Norman in Ramsey Creek Park in Cornelius

=== Duke Power Company and recreation ===
Ever since Duke Power Company constructed Lake Norman, the company has played an integral part in fostering recreation on the lake. In 1964, the year the lake was finished, Duke Power Company leased parcels of land to people for $120 a year. At the time, land use around the lake was limited to hikers and owners of small weekend cabins. However, popularity began to grow, and land parcel lease prices jumped to $2,500 just five years later. With the construction of Interstate 77 in the mid 1970s, Lake Norman became highly accessible to residents of Charlotte, causing an influx of homes, restaurants, golf courses, and various recreational facilities to flood the region.

The Lake Norman area continued into the 2010s, and Duke Power Company continued to play a key role. The company has constructed areas for public fishing as well as boating access around the lake, and Duke Power Company also offers free tours of their facilities on the lake.

In December 2017, Duke Power Company received approval to create an estimated 89 recreation sites on the lake. The project is estimated to take about 20 years, and facilities are projected to include more fishing grounds and boat ramps as well as campgrounds, parking lots, and picnic areas.

=== Hunting and fishing ===
Fish on Lake Norman consists primarily of Striped Bass, Largemouth Bass, Catfish and Bluegill. Each year, anglers are drawn to the area for fishing tournaments hosted by Fishing League Worldwide. Fishing on Lake Norman has also made a substantial contribution to the local economy, as local guide services and tackle shops rely on this form of recreation.

All of the fish in Lake Norman were introduced by humans, as the lake was man-made. Striped bass, introduced for fishing purposes, and Blue Catfish, introduced to control Shad populations, were among the largest species of fish introduced to the lake. Flathead Catfish were later introduced illegally and has unclear origins, but, unlike Blue Catfish, the Flathead is predatory and feeds on other fish. By the 1990s, fish populations plummeted as a result of rising water temperatures. This continued into the 2000s to the point where Striped Bass were pushed to the brink of extinction. Eventually, Spotted Bass were introduced, as they can exist in warmer waters. Spotted and Hybrid Striped-Spotted Bass are the main sport fish in the lake today, although Catfish is the largest fish family in Lake Norman.

Though not attracting as many people as fishing, the autumn waterfowl season attracts hunters to the area. While birds are plentiful on the lake, Lake Norman has lost popularity in the hunting community due to development around the lake as well as more strict regulations regarding hunting and firearms in North Carolina.

=== Lake Norman State Park ===
Duke Power Company donated 1,328 acres of land that eventually became Lake Norman State Park in September 1962. Since then, the park has been a hub for recreation on the lake. Facilities include 30.5 miles of mountain biking/hiking/running trails by the name of the Itusi Trail, the Lakeshore Trail at 5 miles long dedicated to hiking and running only, a 125-yard beach for swimming that is open April 1- October 31, and dock facility that is utilized for both boating and fishing. Use of the docks and boat ramps is free, but a fee of $5 is required for use of the swimming beach. Other facilities include a seasonal campground with 32 sites and kitchen facilities as well as restrooms and a fireplace available for rent, making the Park an accessible and reasonable option for activities and events.

Visitors to Lake Norman State Park increased by nearly 50,000 between 2016 and 2017, reaching 962,000 annual visitors in 2017. The park is one of 12 state parks in North Carolina to receive more than 750,000 visitors in a single year. According to park Superintendent Greg Schneider, people often visit the park in an attempt to reconnect with nature.

Lake Norman State Park holds a rich ecological history. Throughout the 18th, 19th, and part of the 20th century, the land surrounding Lake Norman consisted of cultivated fields. It was not until the mid 20th century that forests, mostly consisting of Pine trees, began to form through intentional planting as well as natural expansion. However, an infestation of Southern Pine Beetles decimated the Pine forests, leaving hardwoods such as Hickory and Dogwood trees to be the main presence. Today, Pine trees can only be found in small patches throughout the park.

The park is home to vast amounts of other wildlife as well, including over 35 species of mammals and a variety of amphibians. Park Superintendent Gregory Schneider regards the mammals in the park as abundant and active, stating, "White-tailed deer and eastern grey squirrel are readily visible from the park roads" and "Coyotes can often be heard yipping and howling during the evening hours." Frogs and turtles can be seen regularly, as they inhabit the wetlands along the park's shores. There are also a variety of snakes, including the venomous Copperhead, living near the shores, but they often go unseen. The park's birdlife consists of both residential and migratory birds, such as geese and mallards. Red-tailed hawks as well as wild turkey also reside in and around the park.

=== Davidson College Lake Campus ===
Planning for the Davidson College Lake Campus began in 1952 when Duke Power agreed to donate 110 acres of lakefront property to Davidson College. Construction of facilities on the site began in 1953, prior to the filling of the reservoir.

During the 1960s, the property became a center for student recreation and collegiate events, hosting annual fraternity regattas and social gatherings. Over subsequent decades, the college established formal operational guidelines for the facility, regulating student access, recreational equipment, and environmental preservation along the shoreline.

== Regulations ==
The creation of Lake Norman requires the implementation of new laws and regulations. Fishing and boating regulations on Lake Norman follow the North Carolina Wildlife Resources Commission's guidelines. Fishing can be done without a license, but live bait must be used. To protect wildlife, certain methods are banned, such as fish traps and trap lines. Fishing and the composition of the Lake itself has undergone many changes throughout Lake Norman's history. The North Carolina Wildlife Resources Commission has introduced certain species of fish to the lake, such as the blue catfish and the striped bass. The Commission regularly introduces populations of the native fish species to ensure healthy populations.

The creation of the lake also introduced the need for new boating regulations. Boats with engines operating at over 10 horsepower must be registered with the state. Multiple controversies relating to boating have occurred in relation to Lake Norman, resulting in some attempts to limit the use of yachts and other large boats on Lake Norman. To govern these regulations, the Lake Norman Safety Commission formed in 1965, aimed at educating recreational users of the lake and enforcing regulations. The committee was created as a reaction to a fatal boating accident in 1965.

Other regulations include the creation of the Lake Norman Commission, consisting of the Lincoln, Catawba, Iredell and Mecklenburg counties. The commission set rules into place to promote safety while on the water, including placing restrictions on the speed of boats while within 150 feet on the Marina and punishments for the defacement of signs. Lake Norman has resulted in the creation of new wildlife regulations. Certain islands along the lake are now designated protected areas for the Blue Heron by the North Carolina Wild Commission. Future nuclear plants along Lake Norman faced pushback from environmental groups due to wildlife concerns of the effects on the wildlife. After inspections and governmental approval, the plans for nuclear power were found to have no effect on the local wildlife. Other points of concern have been the fish populations, pollution of the lake, and the beginning of the recycling program in the 1990s. Nuclear power has become less of a point of controversy over time, and non-profits such as Lake Norman Wildlife Conservationists and Ducks Unlimited.

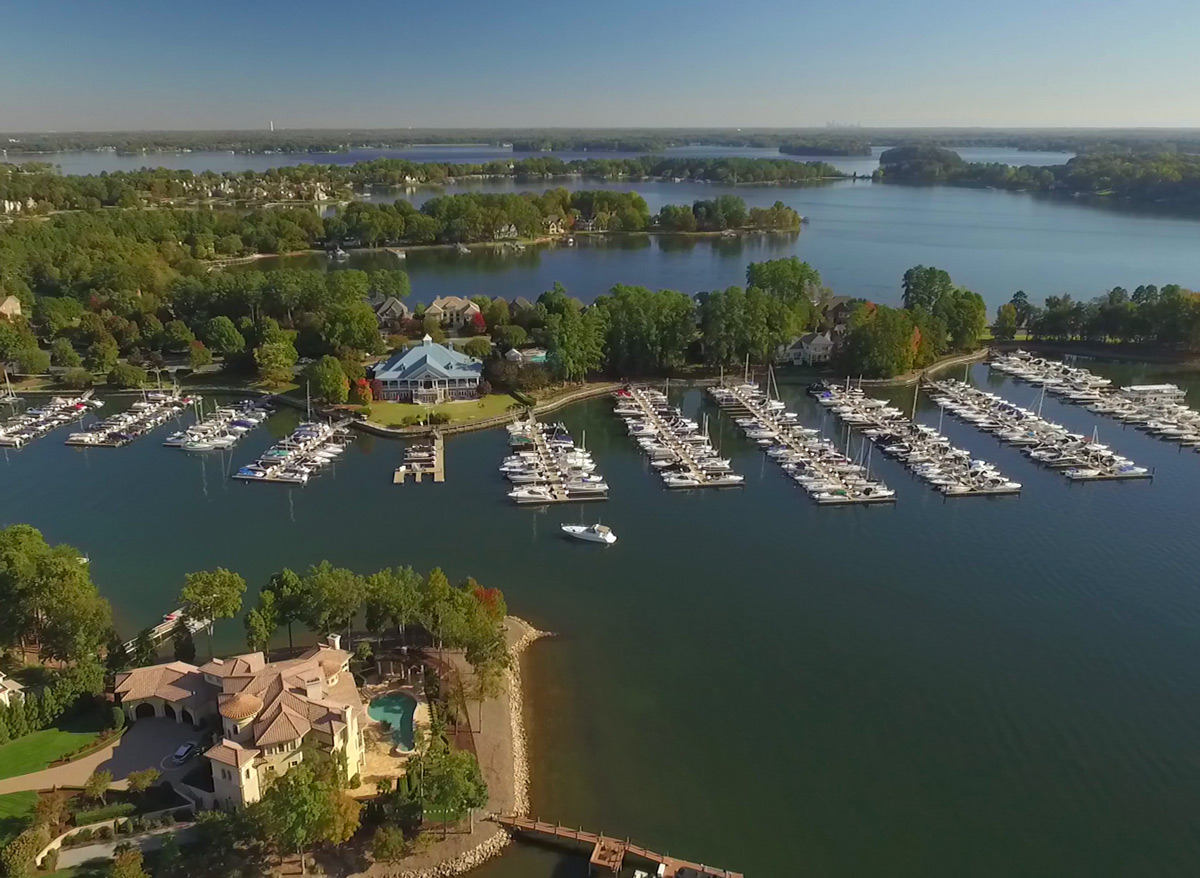
Lake Norman - Peninsula Yacht Club

== Counties ==
- Catawba County
- Iredell County
- Lincoln County
- Mecklenburg County

== Settlements ==
- Chronicle
- Cornelius
- Davidson
- Denver
- Governors Island
- Huntersville
- Lake Norman of Catawba
- Lake Norman of Iredell
- Mooresville
- Sherrills Ford
- Terrell
- Troutman
- Westport
