= Lake Norman of Catawba, North Carolina =

Lake Norman of Catawba
- Census-designated place
- Location within the state of North Carolina
- Coordinates: 35°35′58″N 80°59′02″W
- Country: United States
- State: North Carolina
- County: Catawba

Area
  - Total: 18.75 sq mi (48.56 km^{2})
  - Land: 10.09 sq mi (26.14 km^{2})
  - Water: 8.66 sq mi (22.42 km^{2})
- Elevation: 860 ft (260 m)

Population (2020)
  - Total: 8,658
  - Density: 461.8/sq mi (178.29/km^{2})
- Time zone: UTC-5 (Eastern (EST))
  - Summer (DST): UTC-4 (EDT)
- FIPS code: 37-36511
- GNIS feature ID: 2403201
- Website: https://www.visitlakenorman.org/

Lake Norman of Catawba is a census-designated place (CDP) in Catawba County, North Carolina, United States. The population was 8,658 at the 2020 census up from 7,411 at the 2010 census. It is part of the Hickory-Lenoir-Morganton Metropolitan Statistical Area.

== Geography ==
Lake Norman of Catawba is located in the southeast corner of Catawba County. It consists of several residential developments that occupy the western shore of Lake Norman, a large reservoir on the Catawba River, as well as the shores of numerous inlets on the western side of the lake. The CDP is bounded on the east by the center of the Catawba River, forming the Catawba County/Iredell County line; on the south by the Lincoln County line; and on the west and north by several rural roads, extending as far north as Long Island Road. The CDP includes the unincorporated communities of Terrell, Sherrills Ford, Monbo, and Long Island.

North Carolina Highway 150 crosses the southern part of the CDP, passing through the center of Terrell and leading east 11 miles (18 km) to Mooresville and west 17 miles (27 km) to Lincolnton.

The Marshall Steam Station, a coal power plant operated by Duke Energy, is located in the CDP just northeast of downtown Terrell. On December 11, 2014, Duke Energy, to repair a rusted, leaking pipe, received approval from North Carolina to dump Coal Ash (containing arsenic, lead, thallium and mercury, among other heavy metals) from the Marshall Steam Station into Lake Norman.

On October 3, 2015, Duke reported that a sinkhole had formed at the base of the Marshall Steam Station dam north of Charlotte on Lake Norman. The Department of Environmental Quality (DEQ) says Duke placed a liner in the hole and filled it with crushed stone.

According to the United States Census Bureau, the CDP has a total area of 32.4 square miles (83.8 km^{2}), of which 23.8 square miles (61.7 km^{2}) is land and 8.5 square miles (22.1 km^{2}), or 26.35%, is water.

== Demographics ==
Historical population
Census	Pop.	Note	%±
2020	8,658		—
U.S. Decennial Census

=== 2020 census ===
As of the 2020 census, Lake Norman of Catawba had a population of 8,658. The median age was 51.3 years. 16.4% of residents were under the age of 18 and 22.9% of residents were 65 years of age or older. For every 100 females there were 100.8 males, and for every 100 females age 18 and over there were 99.2 males age 18 and over.

0.0% of residents lived in urban areas, while 100.0% lived in rural areas.

There were 3,631 households in Lake Norman of Catawba, of which 23.9% had children under the age of 18 living in them. Of all households, 62.7% were married-couple households, 15.0% were households with a male householder and no spouse or partner present, and 16.0% were households with a female householder and no spouse or partner present. About 20.2% of all households were made up of individuals and 8.4% had someone living alone who was 65 years of age or older.

There were 4,548 housing units, of which 20.2% were vacant. The homeowner vacancy rate was 1.3% and the rental vacancy rate was 12.4%.

Racial composition as of the 2020 census
Race	Number	Percent
White	7,877	91.0%
Black or African American	218	2.5%
American Indian and Alaska Native	23	0.3%
Asian	58	0.7%
Native Hawaiian and Other Pacific Islander	6	0.1%
Some other race	69	0.8%
Two or more races	407	4.7%
Hispanic or Latino (of any race)	280	3.2%

=== 2000 census ===
As of the 2000 census, there were 4,744 people, 1,988 households, and 1,455 families residing in the CDP. The population density was 248.0 inhabitants per square mile (95.8/km^{2}). There were 2,776 housing units at an average density of 145.1 per square mile (56.0/km^{2}). The racial makeup of the CDP was 97.39% White, 1.31% African American, 0.40% Native American, 0.19% Asian, 0.04% Pacific Islander, 0.23% from other races, and 0.44% from two or more races. Hispanic or Latino of any race were 0.70% of the population.

There were 1,988 households, out of which 25.7% had children under the age of 18 living with them, 64.7% were married couples living together, 5.7% had a female householder with no husband present, and 26.8% were non-families. 21.3% of all households were made up of individuals, and 6.2% had someone living alone who was 65 years of age or older. The average household size was 2.39 and the average family size was 2.77.

In the CDP, the population was spread out, with 19.6% under the age of 18, 5.8% from 18 to 24, 29.8% from 25 to 44, 32.6% from 45 to 64, and 12.2% who were 65 years of age or older. The median age was 42 years. For every 100 females, there were 103.0 males. For every 100 females age 18 and over, there were 101.8 males.

The median income for a household in the CDP was $50,367, and the median income for a family was $55,192. Males had a median income of $40,250 versus $28,650 for females. The per capita income for the CDP was $27,278. About 5.6% of families and 7.1% of the population were below the poverty line, including 12.0% of those under age 18 and 5.5% of those age 65 or over.

== Education ==
Lake Norman of Catawba CDP is in the Catawba County Schools school district.

== Notable person ==
- Patrick McHenry – former U.S. representative
