= Marshall Steam Station =

Coal power plant in North Carolina, US

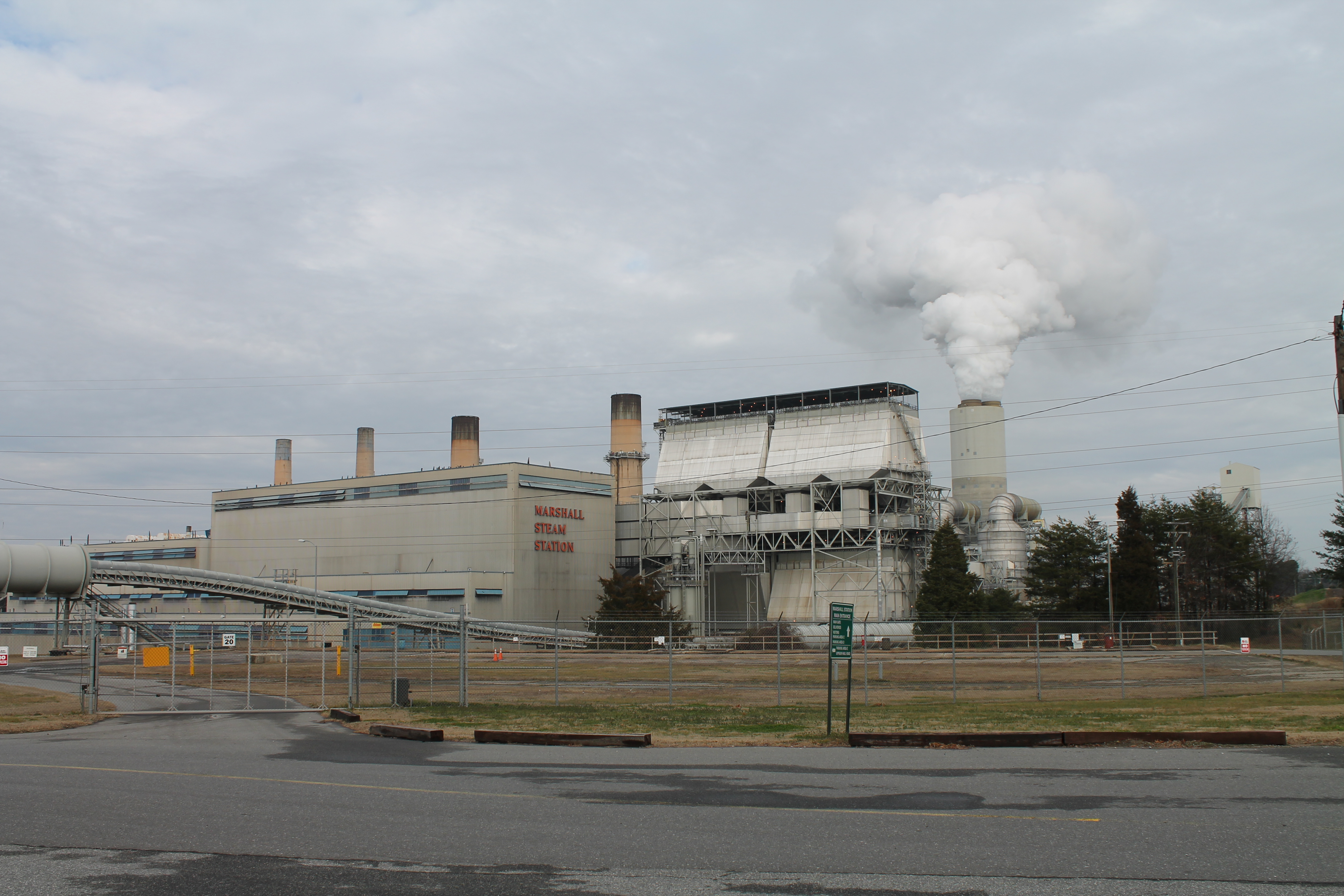
- A view of the steam station from the semi-public, secured entrance off of N.C. Highway 150.
- Country: United States
- Location: Sherrills Ford, Catawba County, North Carolina
- Coordinates: 35°35′51″N 80°57′53″W
- Status: Operational
- Commission date: 1964
- Owner: Duke Energy

Thermal power station
- Primary fuel: Coal and natural gas

Power generation
- Units operational: 2 × 350 MW; 2 × 648 MW
- Nameplate capacity: 1996 MW

Marshall Steam Station is a coal and natural gas burning power plant located at 35°35′51″N 80°57′53″W in Sherrills Ford, Catawba County, North Carolina, United States and owned by Duke Energy. Named for former company president E.C. Marshall, the station is located on Lake Norman and began commercial operation in 1965. The plant originally only burned coal.

The plant generates enough electricity (2.09 GW) to power approximately two million homes.

== Description ==
The plant consists of four units. The first two, at 350 MWe each, were launched in 1965 and 1966. The other two units, at 648 MWe each, were launched in 1969 and 1970.

A unique type of burner arrangement in the boilers keeps the nitrogen oxide emissions from the Marshall facility well below regulatory limits. In 2004, Duke Energy began installing scrubbers, which lower the station's sulfur dioxide emissions by approximately 95 percent. The project was completed in late 2007.

On December 11, 2014, Duke Energy, to repair a rusted, leaking pipe, received approval from North Carolina to dump coal ash (containing arsenic, lead, thallium and mercury, among other heavy metals) from the Marshall Steam Station into Lake Norman.

A combination of factors has led to elevated levels of trihalomethanes, or THMs, in eight of the 12 water sampling stations around Charlotte, according to regularly scheduled water tests in August 2015. A Duke Energy spokeswoman called the utility's use of bromide cleaners at two area coal plants a "triggering event" contributing to the increase in THMs since January 2014. In 2013, Duke started using calcium bromide at Allen Steam Station in Gaston County and Marshall Steam Station in Catawba County to meet federal air-quality rules, including the removal of mercury. In May 2015, Duke stopped using bromide as a cleaner [Duke Energy has not yet commented on what they have replaced it with]. These effects are unrelated to continuing concerns over the disposal of coal-ash and its impact on drinking water.

Groundwater at Marshall, north of Charlotte, does flow toward Lake Norman, and the contaminated field abuts the lake for about 30 feet of shoreline near its largest ash basin.

On October 3, 2015, Duke reported that a sinkhole had formed at the base of the Marshall Steam Station dam north of Charlotte on Lake Norman. The Department of Environmental Quality (DEQ) says Duke placed a liner in the hole and filled it with crushed stone.

In 2021, Duke Energy completed construction activities to allow natural gas co-firing on all four units. For every pound of coal replaced with gas, the company claims emissions of sulfur dioxide will be reduced by 99% and carbon dioxide by 40% per megawatt-hour.

== See also ==
- List of power stations
