= Water sampling station =

Device for monitoring drinking water

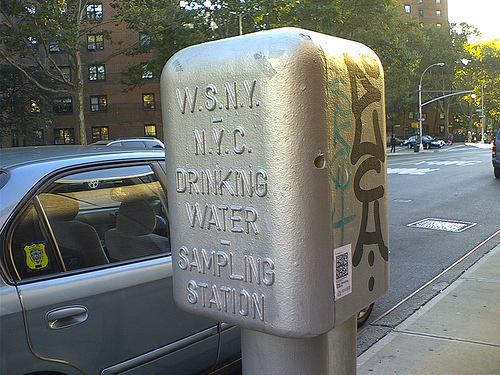
Water Sampling Station

To enhance water quality monitoring in a drinking water network, water sampling stations are installed at various points along the network's route. These sampling stations are typically positioned at street level, where they connect to a local water main, and are designed as enclosed, secured boxes containing a small sink and spigot to aid in sample collection. Collected samples are analyzed for bacteria, chlorine levels, pH, inorganic and organic pollutants, turbidity, odor and many other water quality indicators.

== Regulation ==
In the United States, water sampling stations aid in public infrastructural safety with regards to water quality monitoring and help municipalities comply with federal and state drinking water regulations. New York City has 965 sampling stations that are distributed based on population density, water pressure zones, proximity to water mains and accessibility. The stations rise about 4.5 feet (1.4 m) above the ground and are made of heavy cast iron. Using these stations, the New York City Department of Environmental Protection (DEP) collects more than 1,300 water samples per month from up to 546 locations.

== Cultural references ==
- In William Gibson's Pattern Recognition the protagonist Cayce Pollard mentions Water Sampling Stations. Her "favorite fantasy of alternative employment is to stroll Manhattan like an itinerant sommelier, addressing one's palate with various tap waters of the City". (Chapter 4, Page 26, Paperback Edition)
