= McGuire Nuclear Station =

Nuclear power plant in North Carolina, United States

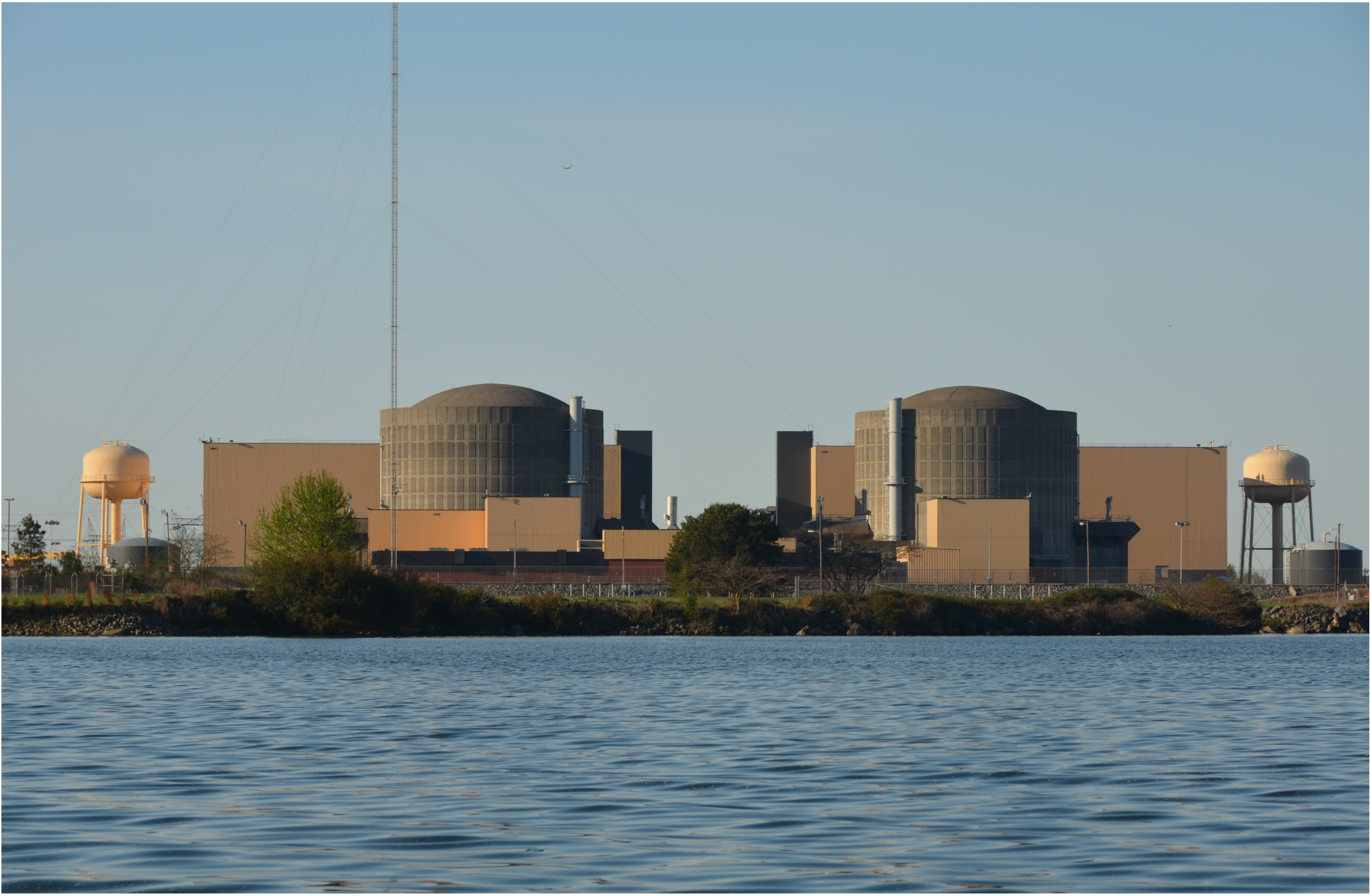
- McGuire Nuclear Station from Lake Norman
- Country: United States
- Location: Mecklenburg County, near Huntersville, North Carolina
- Coordinates: 35°25′57″N 80°56′54″W
- Status: Operational
- Construction began: April 1, 1971
- Commission date: Unit 1: December 1, 1981; Unit 2: March 1, 1984
- Construction cost: $4 billion (2007 USD)
- Owner: Duke Energy
- Operator: Duke Energy

Nuclear power station
- Reactor type: PWR
- Reactor supplier: Westinghouse
- Cooling source: Lake Norman
- Thermal capacity: 2 × 3411 MW_{th}

Power generation
- Units operational: 2 × 1158 MW
- Make and model: WH 4-loop (ICECND)
- Nameplate capacity: 2316 MW
- Capacity factor: 92.65% (2017); 83.40% (lifetime)
- Annual net output: 19,622 GWh (2021)

External links
- Website: McGuire Nuclear Station

The McGuire Nuclear Station is a nuclear power plant located about 17 miles (27 km) northwest of Charlotte, North Carolina. The plant began construction in 1971, with the two reactors beginning operation in 1981 and 1984. Water from nearby Lake Norman is used to cool the condensers.

The plant has two Westinghouse pressurized water reactors and can produce 2,250 megawatts of net power. The plant achieved a net generation of 17,514 GW·h in 2005, representing 44% of the total nuclear power generation for the state of North Carolina.

== Ownership ==
McGuire Nuclear Station is operated by Duke Power Company and owned by the Duke Energy Corporation. It is named for William McGuire, who served as president of Duke Power from 1959 to 1971.

== License ==
The original operating licenses' dates of expiration were 2021-06-12 for Unit 1 and 2023-03-03 for Unit 2. In 2003, the Nuclear Regulatory Commission (NRC) renewed the licenses for both reactors for an additional twenty years.

== Electricity production ==
Generation (MWh) of McGuire Nuclear Station
Year	Jan	Feb	Mar	Apr	May	Jun	Jul	Aug	Sep	Oct	Nov	Dec	Annual (Total)
2001	1,542,205	1,543,023	1,075,447	1,157,449	1,705,132	1,627,907	1,585,238	1,657,855	1,615,998	1,700,128	1,652,790	1,699,810	18,562,982
2002	1,720,599	1,373,595	830,371	1,656,298	1,701,986	1,625,265	1,653,989	1,591,877	1,139,792	1,369,842	1,654,342	1,696,392	18,014,348
2003	1,677,295	1,555,397	1,708,652	1,644,115	1,674,613	1,627,767	1,660,372	1,640,896	922,488	1,468,919	1,643,607	1,716,155	18,940,276
2004	1,720,206	1,608,164	994,293	1,307,751	1,698,415	1,619,740	1,657,977	1,656,104	1,614,716	1,302,418	1,336,295	1,716,456	18,232,535
2005	1,721,066	1,552,860	870,146	1,068,933	1,704,720	1,636,376	1,648,514	1,657,306	1,231,042	1,157,517	1,601,031	1,664,652	17,514,163
2006	1,726,667	1,559,972	1,722,683	1,660,821	1,689,810	1,627,989	1,661,375	1,659,402	1,206,963	840,463	1,312,906	1,722,776	18,391,827
2007	1,725,372	1,556,853	1,054,788	830,422	869,101	1,583,754	1,668,162	1,660,238	1,608,868	1,683,683	1,657,497	1,720,754	17,619,492
2008	1,720,783	1,613,034	856,332	1,152,310	1,707,822	1,521,020	1,662,112	1,662,554	1,321,089	845,261	1,281,613	1,726,069	17,069,999
2009	1,727,062	1,556,691	1,722,296	1,665,795	1,709,086	1,639,023	1,675,706	1,643,436	902,375	1,391,637	1,660,970	1,720,666	19,014,743
2010	1,704,695	1,554,693	1,191,998	1,089,408	1,704,631	1,499,515	1,682,901	1,681,986	1,630,701	1,713,528	1,668,698	1,727,672	18,850,426
2011	1,376,709	1,470,994	855,324	1,495,659	1,720,232	1,646,418	1,685,023	1,686,086	1,251,546	1,265,643	1,668,375	1,727,638	17,849,647
2012	1,729,792	1,618,311	1,722,555	1,668,306	1,717,612	1,650,553	1,686,214	1,686,019	1,190,891	852,694	812,435	1,632,770	17,968,152
2013	1,728,605	1,435,963	1,239,683	1,019,338	1,727,502	1,607,288	1,710,987	1,706,713	1,649,329	1,718,202	1,603,071	1,750,925	18,897,606
2014	1,747,971	1,579,363	1,459,052	983,382	1,742,798	1,669,664	1,711,587	1,710,640	1,163,774	877,727	1,201,272	1,738,975	17,586,205
2015	1,776,991	1,398,442	1,773,979	1,717,624	1,770,605	1,696,529	1,683,697	1,655,083	1,129,198	1,436,739	1,719,129	1,777,986	19,536,002
2016	1,774,577	1,663,224	1,396,671	1,221,969	1,769,044	1,694,452	1,727,341	1,722,675	1,676,758	1,750,810	1,713,224	1,773,544	19,884,289
2017	1,772,980	1,452,409	1,349,302	1,057,863	1,763,952	1,698,398	1,733,716	1,732,498	1,441,760	1,290,731	1,721,139	1,780,788	18,795,536
2018	1,779,429	1,559,059	1,769,804	1,719,481	1,771,211	1,701,053	1,735,365	1,735,111	1,227,849	1,366,218	1,719,289	1,778,199	19,862,068
2019	1,777,069	1,604,776	1,482,067	961,560	1,693,934	1,692,657	1,736,020	1,732,188	1,677,292	1,749,550	1,709,575	1,771,567	19,588,255
2020	1,771,726	1,654,650	1,418,525	1,322,452	1,756,547	1,705,463	1,741,701	1,719,614	1,339,715	1,134,015	1,711,189	1,771,352	19,046,949
2021	1,772,921	1,484,690	1,764,204	1,711,926	1,760,108	1,692,278	1,730,004	1,721,533	1,108,602	1,424,276	1,714,327	1,777,245	19,662,114
2022	1,776,712	1,471,429	1,742,241	873,954	1,479,852	1,687,349	1,737,678	1,738,369	1,683,910	1,763,571	1,718,214	1,777,031	19,450,310
2023	1,773,061	1,284,101	879,631	1,483,585	1,758,014	1,683,781	1,733,564	1,724,342	1,243,055	1,028,722	1,709,332	1,767,184	18,068,372
2024	1,768,192	1,653,595	1,762,278	1,706,607	1,756,381	1,682,689	1,723,337	1,699,086	1,061,140	1,750,025	1,704,703	1,765,301	20,033,334
2025	1,765,586	1,593,695	1,692,317	1,131,886	1,750,766	1,683,791	1,715,244	1,716,371	1,666,619	1,478,319	1,695,041	1,615,854	19,505,489
2026	1,637,832	1,592,781	1,438,857	1,037,892	1,743,446	1,666,143	1,706,519	1,681,110					--

== Surrounding population ==
The NRC defines two emergency planning zones around nuclear power plants: a plume exposure pathway zone with a radius of 10 miles (16 km), concerned primarily with exposure to, and inhalation of, airborne radioactive contamination, and an ingestion pathway zone of about 50 miles (80 km), concerned primarily with ingestion of food and liquid contaminated by radioactivity.

The 2010 U.S. population within 10 miles (16 km) of McGuire was 199,869, an increase of 66.8 percent in a decade, according to an analysis of U.S. Census data for msnbc.com. The 2010 U.S. population within 50 miles (80 km) was 2,850,782, an increase of 23.3 percent since 2000. Cities within 50 miles include Charlotte (17 miles to city center).

== Ice condensers ==
The McGuire Nuclear Station uses ice condensers as part of its emergency containment systems. A nuclear plant ice condenser is a passive, static heat sink that relies on large quantities of ice to mitigate severe accidents. Ice condensers are designed to limit pressure in the event of an accidental steam release. This design allows smaller containment structures and reduced material requirements.

== Seismic risk ==
The NRC's estimate of the risk each year of an earthquake intense enough to cause core damage to the reactor at McGuire was 1 in 32,258, according to an NRC study published in August 2010.

== Stator replacement project ==
During 2014 McGuire Nuclear Station powered down one of its units to undergo a routine refueling outage, critical to the operation of the plant. This outage was particularly significant because McGuire performed a major evolution – the replacement of a generator stator. The stator is part of the electric generator and is among the largest and heaviest components in the plant, weighing approximately 1.2 million pounds. The work was carried out by Siemens Energy Inc. The lifting contractor was Sarens who used a structural temporary lifting system to remove the existing Stator and install the new Stator. A specialist engineering company named Lowther-Rolton performed a "Technical Audit" of the lifting and installation engineering to ensure safety of operations. Lowther-Rolton were the original developers of the Technical Audit system for load movement operations.

== See also ==
- List of largest power stations in the United States
