= Cowans Ford Hydroelectric Station =

Coordinates: 35.4349°N 80.9584°W

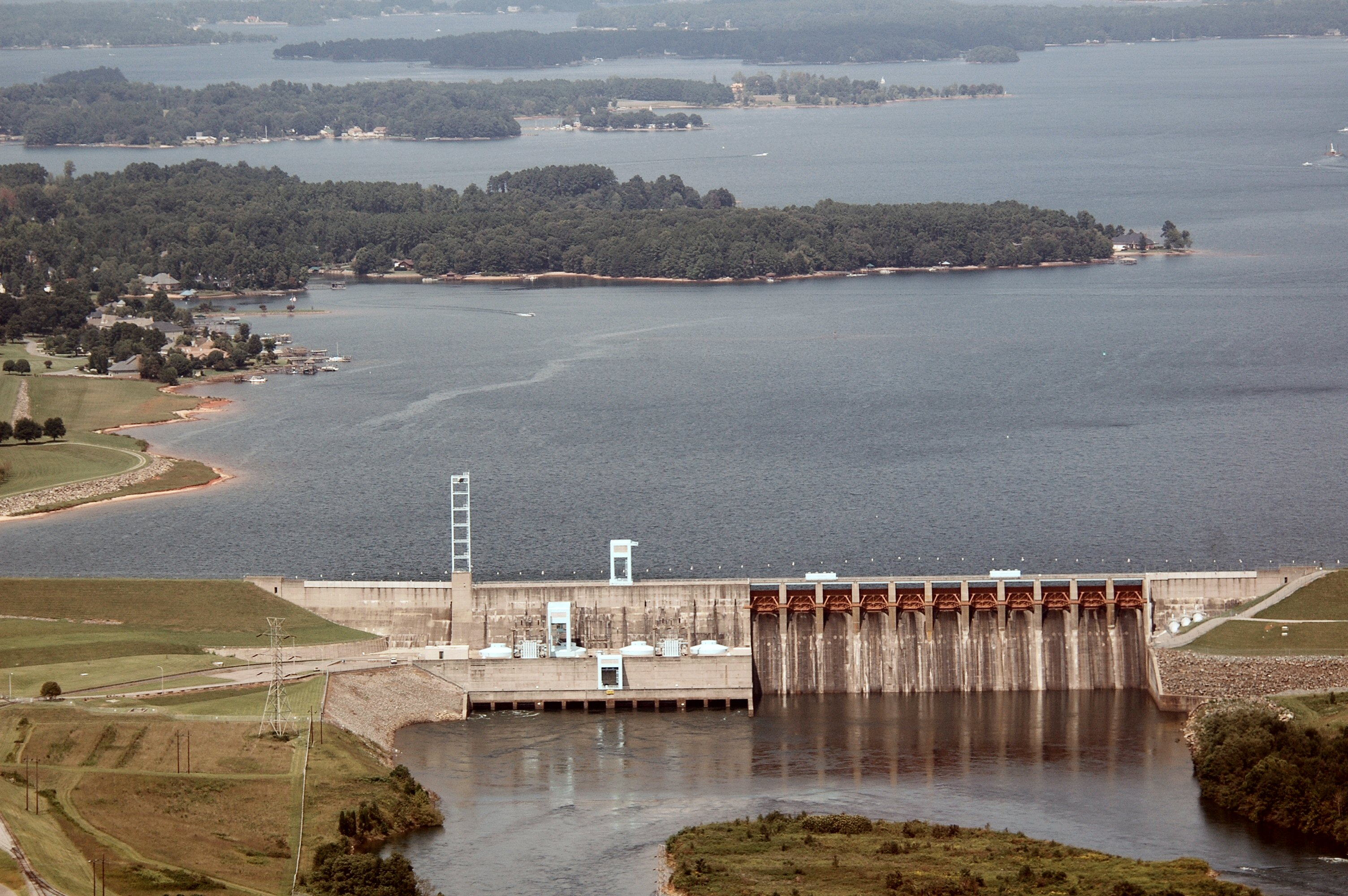
- Interactive map of Cowans Ford Hydroelectric Station
- Location: Mecklenburg County, North Carolina, United States
- Status: Operational
- Construction began: 1959
- Opening date: 1963
- Owner: Duke Energy
- Operator: Duke Energy

Dam and spillways
- Height (foundation): 134 ft
- Length: 8,738 ft (2,663 m)

Reservoir
- Creates: Lake Norman
- Total capacity: 1,093,600 acre-feet (1,348,900,000 m³)
- Surface area: 50.80 sq mi (131.6 km^{2})

Power Station
- Turbines: 4 x 87.5MWKaplan-type
- Installed capacity: 350.0 MW
- Annual generation: 154,287.4 MWh

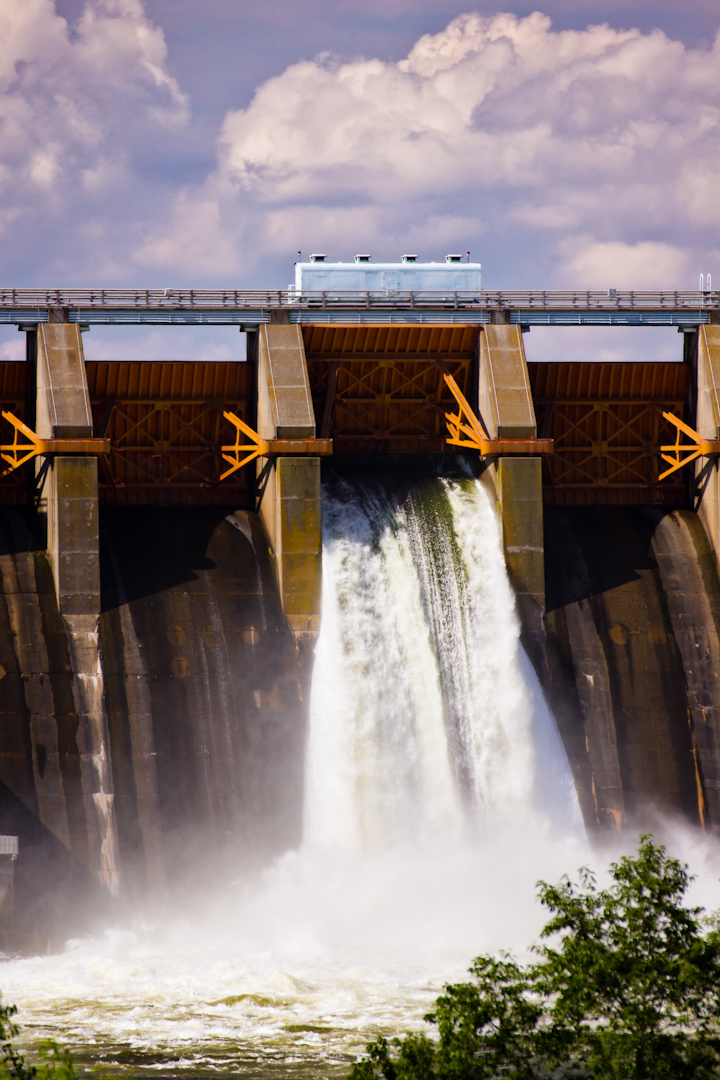
Providing relief at the Cowan's Ford Dam because of above average rain fall in the spring and summer of 2013.

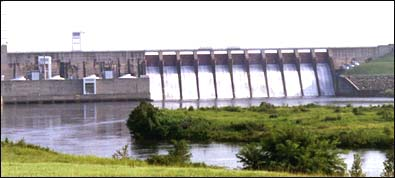
Cowans Ford Dam

Cowans Ford Hydroelectric Station is a hydroelectric power plant and dam located near Huntersville, North Carolina, approximately 20 miles north of Charlotte on Lake Norman. It is the largest conventional hydro station owned by Duke Energy, generating up to 350 MW of power.

Three units began generating electricity in 1963, with a fourth unit beginning operation in 1967. They supply "peaking power"—extra electricity needed to meet demand when it is needed most—typically hot summer days and cold winter mornings.

Cowans Ford Dam impounds the Catawba River to create Lake Norman, the largest man-made body of fresh water in North Carolina. The lake provides water to Lincoln County and the communities of Davidson, Mooresville, Charlotte and Huntersville. The lake was named for former Duke Power president Norman Cocke.

== See also ==
- Battle of Cowan's Ford
