= Westport, North Carolina =

- Census-designated place
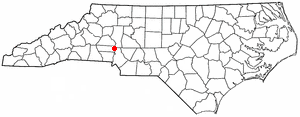
- Location of Westport, North Carolina
- Coordinates: 35°30′37″N 80°58′42″W
- Country: United States
- State: North Carolina
- County: Lincoln

Area
  - Total: 5.61 sq mi (14.52 km^{2})
  - Land: 3.67 sq mi (9.51 km^{2})
  - Water: 1.94 sq mi (5.02 km^{2})
- Elevation: 758 ft (231 m)

Population (2020)
  - Total: 5,705
  - Density: 1,554.1/sq mi (600.05/km^{2})
- Time zone: UTC-5 (Eastern (EST))
  - Summer (DST): UTC-4 (EDT)
- FIPS code: 37-72755
- GNIS feature ID: 2403015

Westport is an unincorporated community and census-designated place (CDP) located in Lincoln County, North Carolina, United States. As of the 2020 census, Westport had a population of 5,705. The community's name comes from its location on the west side of Lake Norman.

== Geography ==
Westport is located in the northeast corner of Lincoln County along several coves on the western shore of Lake Norman, a reservoir on the Catawba River. The southern border of the CDP is Graham Creek, while Burton Creek reaches into the center of the community. The eastern border of the CDP is the Lincoln County line in the center of Lake Norman, with Iredell County to the east.

North Carolina Highway 16 Business forms the western edge of the Westport CDP. The highway leads northwest 3.5 miles (5.6 km) to Denver and south 5 miles (8 km) to Lowesville. Downtown Charlotte is 24 miles (39 km) to the southeast of Westport.

According to the United States Census Bureau, the CDP has a total area of 5.6 square miles (14.5 km^{2}), of which 3.7 square miles (9.5 km^{2}) are land and 1.9 square miles (5.0 km^{2}), or 34.54%, are water.

== Demographics ==
Historical population
Census	Pop.	Note	%±
2020	5,705		—
U.S. Decennial Census

=== 2020 census ===
As of the 2020 census, there were 5,705 people, 2,138 households, and 1,321 families residing in the CDP.

The median age was 45.8 years. 23.1% of residents were under the age of 18 and 18.2% were 65 years of age or older. For every 100 females, there were 100.5 males, and for every 100 females age 18 and over, there were 99.8 males.

There were 2,293 housing units, of which 6.8% were vacant. The homeowner vacancy rate was 1.4% and the rental vacancy rate was 5.2%.

0.0% of residents lived in urban areas, while 100.0% lived in rural areas.

Westport racial composition
Race	Number	Percentage
White (non-Hispanic)	5,109	89.55%
Black or African American (non-Hispanic)	156	2.73%
Native American	2	0.04%
Asian	62	1.09%
Other/Mixed	182	3.19%
Hispanic or Latino	194	3.4%

=== 2000 census ===
As of the census of 2000, there were 2,006 people, 776 households, and 650 families residing in the CDP. The population density was 653.3 people per square mile (252.2 people/km^{2}). There were 826 housing units at an average density of 269.0 per square mile (103.9/km^{2}). The racial makeup of the CDP was 98.01% White, 0.75% African American, 0.05% Native American, 0.75% Asian, 0.05% from other races, and 0.40% from two or more races. Hispanic or Latino of any race were 0.95% of the population.

There were 776 households, out of which 32.2% had children under the age of 18 living with them, 77.3% were married couples living together, 4.5% had a female householder with no husband present, and 16.2% were non-families. 12.6% of all households were made up of individuals, and 4.0% had someone living alone who was 65 years of age or older. The average household size was 2.58 and the average family size was 2.82.

In the CDP, the population was spread out, with 23.2% under the age of 18, 3.3% from 18 to 24, 27.8% from 25 to 44, 34.0% from 45 to 64, and 11.6% who were 65 years of age or older. The median age was 42 years. For every 100 females, there were 101.4 males. For every 100 females age 18 and over, there were 98.1 males.

The median income for a household in the CDP was $81,232, and the median income for a family was $82,422. Males had a median income of $51,571 versus $31,016 for females. The per capita income for the CDP was $34,189. About 2.7% of families and 5.3% of the population were below the poverty line, including 7.7% of those under age 18 and 10.4% of those age 65 or over.
