= Museum of Life and Science =

- Established: 1946
- Location: Durham, North Carolina
- Coordinates: 36.02865°N 78.89734°W
- Type: science museum, children's museum, and zoo
- President: Carrie Heinonen
- Website: www.lifeandscience.org

Association of Science-Technology Centers
- astc.org

The Museum of Life and Science—previously known as the North Carolina Museum of Life and Science and the NC Children's Museum—is an 84-acre (340,000 m^{2}) science museum located in Durham, North Carolina, United States.

The museum campus lies in the midst of the Northgate Park neighborhood, bisected by Murray Avenue. The main building is located on the north tract, along with the Butterfly House, Hideaway Woods, Farmyard, Sprout Cafe, Explore the Wild nature park, Catch the Wind, Dinosaur Trail, and the 2 ft (610 mm) narrow gauge Ellerbe Creek C.P. Huntington train ride. The museum features both indoor and outdoor learning environments. The southern tract is now largely devoted to parking and administrative buildings, including a parking deck completed in early 2018. Prior to the construction of the new main building in the early 1990s, the structures on the southern tract contained the bulk of the museum's exhibit space.

== History ==
Richard (Dick) Wescott played a major role in the development and growth of the Museum of Life and Science during his tenure as director. He began there as a volunteer, soon became the curator, and by 1970 had become executive director, although he continued to fill the role of curator as well. Over the years, both he and the museum flourished. By the early 1970s, when the name was changed to the NC Museum of Life and Science, the little green hut on Murray Avenue had grown into a complex with several buildings housing a wide range of collections, artifacts, models, and murals, highlighted through a number of permanent exhibits. With the support of local friends and board members like Carolyn London and the late Dr. Kenneth Hall and the building of new relationships with others, such as the late Louis Purnell, at the National Air and Space Museum and the Michael Collins, an Apollo 11 crew member, the museum continued to grow, building one of the finest collections of space memorabilia in the country. This exhibit featured a representation of the Apollo 15 flight and included one of only four extant Apollo Lunar Modules (LEM), as well as a one-of-a-kind walk through the entire process of launching a rocket, designed specifically for blind visitors. The museum also grew a significant collection of live animals and Dick began to collaborate with Jim Fowler and others, as they planned for the creation of an exhibit in and around the abandoned rock quarry across the street from the original complex. The narrow-gauge railroad, which remains operative, was the first step in building a unique exhibit of native species living in a natural habitat. Dinosaur Trail - more than twenty life-size models have resided along the banks of Ellerbee Creek, for some thirty years now - designed and constructed by Dick, with the help of a handful of volunteers and his ever-present "right hand," the late Willie Holloway, after a visit to the museum by the late Dr. Louis Leakey. In the late 1970s, he and Margie relocated to Augusta, Georgia. where he was director of the Augusta-Richmond County Museum for the next fifteen years.

== Exhibits ==
=== Main Museum Building ===
The two-story main building of the museum houses exhibits about weather, sound, math, health, building and engineering, and native North Carolina wildlife. The building also includes a play area for 6 years and younger children and a hands-on lab that does frequently rotating topics and activities.

=== The Farmyard ===
The farmyard is home to a variety of farm animals including a donkey, goats, chickens, bulls, and pigs. The more recent additions to the farmyard are several alpacas. The farmyard offers guests the chance to see how zoos provide enrichment for animals as well as weekly up-close experiences guided by animal keepers. There are several other hands-on activities within the farmyard.

=== Hideaway Woods ===
In 2015, the museum opened Hideaway Woods, a two-acre, nature discovery environment featuring eight tree houses, a flowing stream bed, and fanciful nature sculptures. The space also includes hammocks and an enclosed area for younger explorers. The play zones throughout this exhibit emphasize the importance of nature play.

=== Aerospace ===
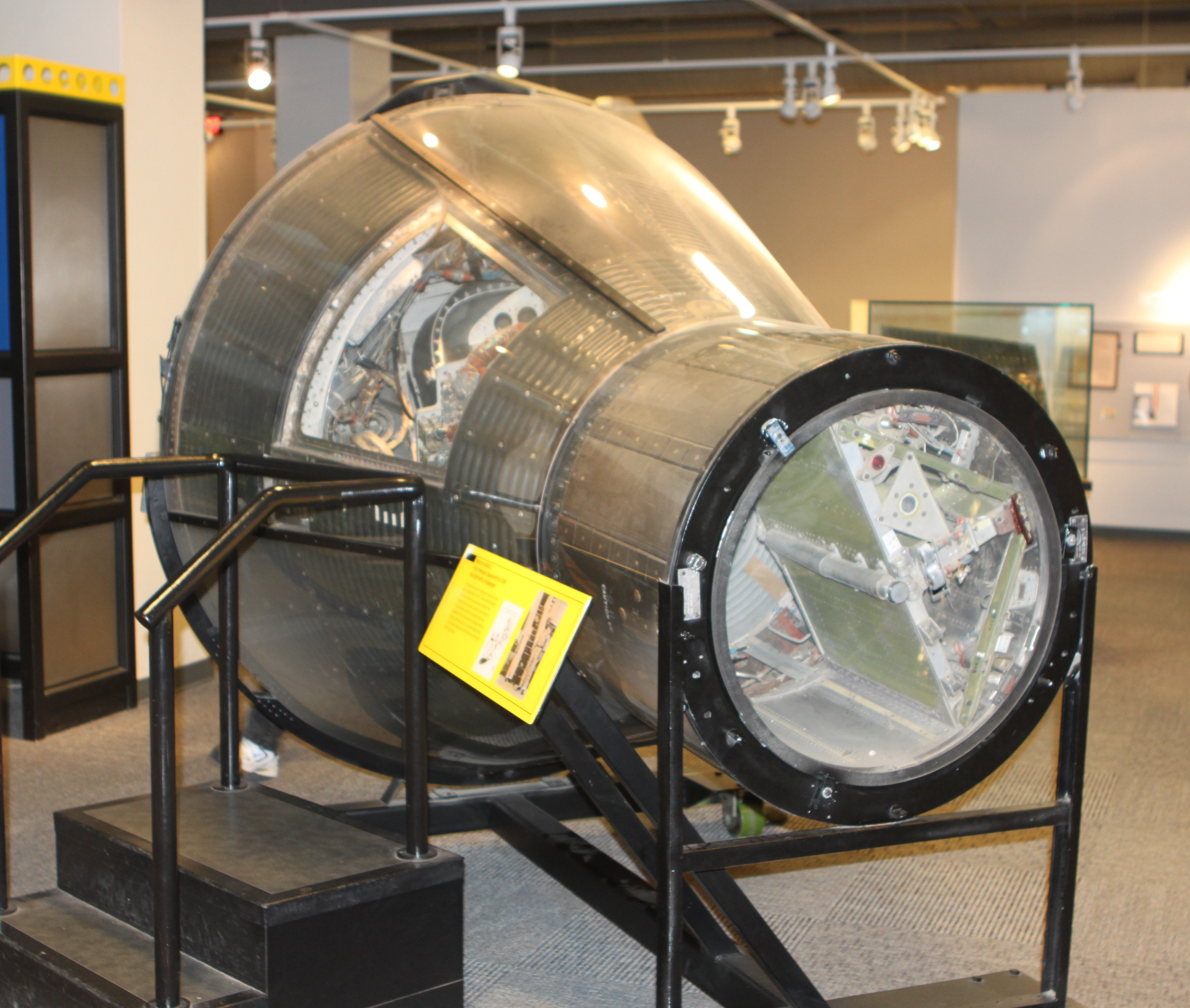
The Project Mercury space capsule used in the November 29, 1961 Mercury-Atlas 5 mission, on which the chimpanzee Enos became the only chimpanzee and third primate to orbit the Earth, is exhibited at the museum

The MLS has historically been most notable for its Aerospace exhibit, which focuses on the early NASA space program. Most of the artifacts on display are on long-term loan from the National Air and Space Museum. Many of these are significant Project Apollo-related artifacts, such as a Moon rock, Neil Armstrong's dosimeter, an Apollo Command Module test vehicle, a portion of an Apollo Lunar Rover, and a full-sized mock-up of a Lunar Module. The MLS came into possession of these artifacts through the influence of James E. Webb, the second NASA administrator and a native of North Carolina. Instrumental in the acquisition of the NASA artifacts was Richard Wescott, the executive director of the museum at the time. Aerospace includes a hands-on aerodynamics space, Launch Lab, that features paper airplane launchers and wind tunnels.

=== BioQuest ===
In the mid-1990s, the museum announced a four-phase expansion to their outdoor exhibits they called BioQuest. BioQuest included the construction of new exhibit spaces: Magic Wings Butterfly House, Explore the Wild, Catch the Wind, and the Dinosaur Trail and Dig.

=== Magic Wings Butterfly House ===
A major attraction at MLS is the three-story glass Magic Wings Butterfly House, which opened April 17, 1999, a butterfly zoo and tropical conservatory featuring a community of several hundred tropical butterflies representing dozens of species, as well as an array of tropical plants. The Bayer CropScience Insectarium, located in the Magic Wings Butterfly House, features exotic insects from around the world. This exhibit was the first of the BioQuest expansion to be completed.

=== Explore the Wild ===
Explore the Wild is home to American black bears, red wolves, lemurs, and radiated tortoises. It features a 900-foot (270 m) boardwalk over a preserved 6-acre (24,000 m^{2}) natural space, plus many multimedia exhibits. The exhibit opened in May 2006. The museum is part of preservation efforts for the red wolves and radiated tortoises. In spring 2017 the red wolf pair housed at the museum had a litter of four pups. These pups accounted for 2% of the entire red wolf population at the time. As part of the red wolf Specific Survival Plan the museum participates in, the family of wolves was moved to another facility in New York and a new pair of wolves came to the museum. Spring 2018 brought a litter of two pups to the new red wolf pair. The four wolves remain at the museum for the time being. In 2018 the museum joined efforts for radiated tortoise conservation after the April 20, 2018 discovery of 10,000 housed illegally in Madagascar. The museum hosted a fundraiser to raise money for the tortoises at the museum and a conservation group in August 2018.

=== Catch the Wind ===
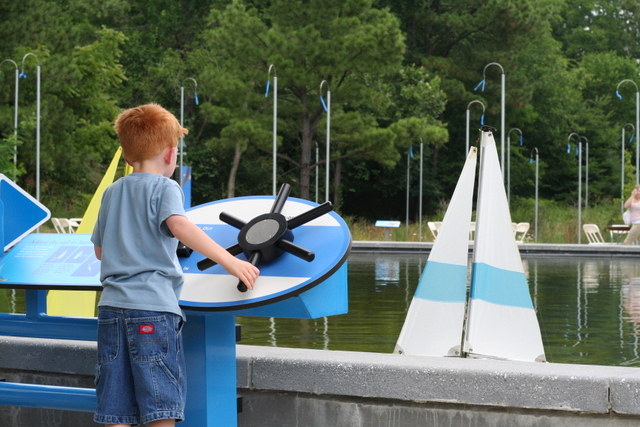
Sailboat pond

Catch the Wind opened in the Summer of 2007 and features seven exhibits showing how the wind influences our environment.

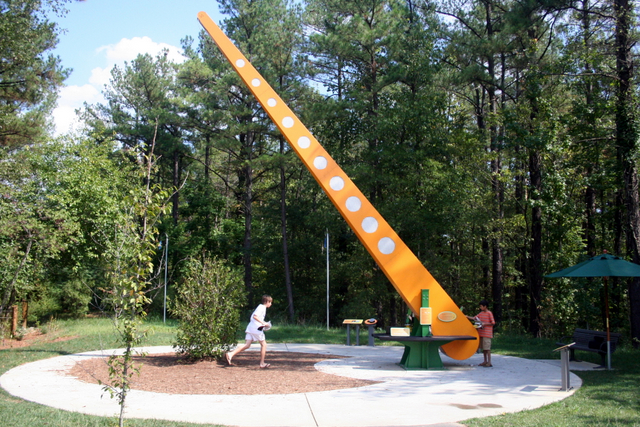
Seed tower

A 30-foot (9 m) interactive tower elevates oversized representations of seed pods of trees native to North Carolina and drops them demonstrating how wind affects their travel. The centerpiece of the area is a 5,000-square-foot (500 m^{2}) elliptical sailboat pond where visitors can sail remote controlled sailboats.

Kiosks throughout the area allow visitors to listen to audio tracks of narratives, poems, and stories about the wind.

=== Dinosaur Trail ===
Long a local favorite, the original Prehistoric Trail featured a number of life-size plaster amphibians, reptiles and dinosaurs set along a woodland path. The Brontosaurus is visible from Murray Avenue. According to a 1965 pamphlet, the trail's original lineup featured a Seymouria, an Eryops, a Dimetrodon, an Araeoscelis, a Saltoposuchus, a Yaleosaurus, a Plateosaurus, and a Camptosaurus. Later additions included a T-Rex and a Triceratops. The trail also provided models of a mammoth and a rhinoceros for scale. The creatures were built by Richard Wescott over a four-year period, culminating with the exhibit's completion in 1967. It was renamed the Dinosaur Trail in 1986. While most of the models still exist, the trail was rendered largely impassable by Hurricane Fran in 1996 and has since fallen into disrepair. Between 2006 and 2009, local residents worked with the museum to remove some of the debris from the trail.

The brontosaurus model was vandalized during the early morning hours of June 1, 2009, when vandals removed a large portion of the neck and the entire head. At a later date, the head was found, and the Brontosaurus was repaired and improved through a partnership with the local Northgate Park neighborhood.

The final phase in the BioQuest expansion project, a new dinosaur trail opened in July 2009. The new trail is housed within the northern tract of the museum, separate from the original trail located near Ellerbe Creek. It features life size models of Albertosaurus, Styracosaurus, Troodon, Maiasaura, Stygimoloch, Alamosaurus, Leptoceratops, and Edmontonia. The dinosaur trail also features a full-sized reclining juvenile Parasaurolophus built for visitors to climb, making it especially popular. An interactive fossil dig area is also available where shovels and screens are available for children to search for, and take home, sharks teeth, coral, other fossils brought up from an abandoned mine in Eastern North Carolina which was once part of the ocean floor.

=== Earth Moves ===
The "Earth Moves" exhibit, opened in 2019, provides an immersive experience in geology and its relation to everyday life. Visitors can explore a cave made from sandstone, change the flow of a 20-foot waterfall and splash in it, make towers, walls and arches of stone, and sculpt sand.
