= Shotgun house =

Narrow rectangular domestic residence

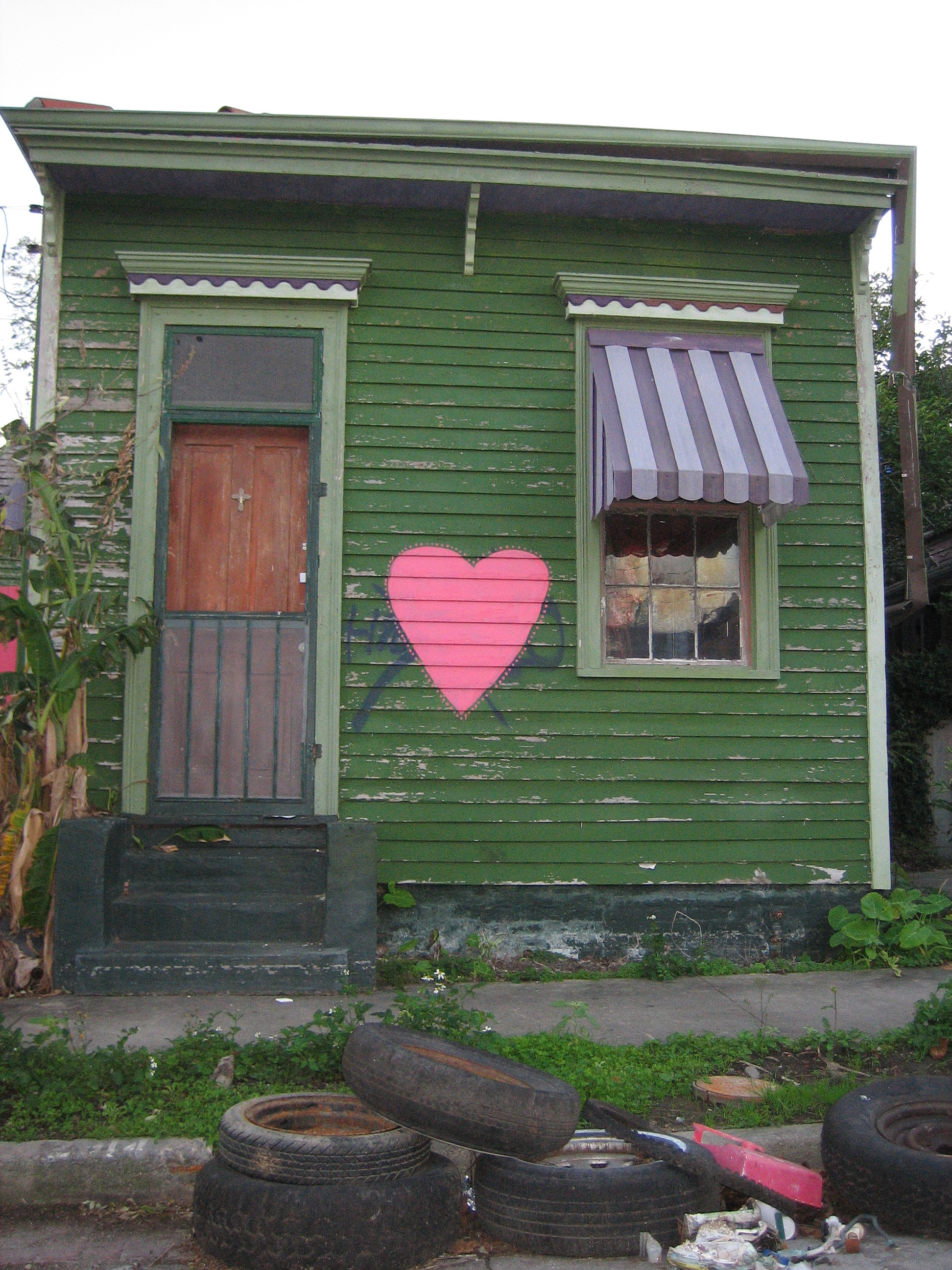
A modest shotgun house in New Orleans's Bayou Saint John neighborhood shortly after Hurricane Katrina. Shotgun houses consist of three to five rooms in a row with no hallways and have a narrow, rectangular structure.

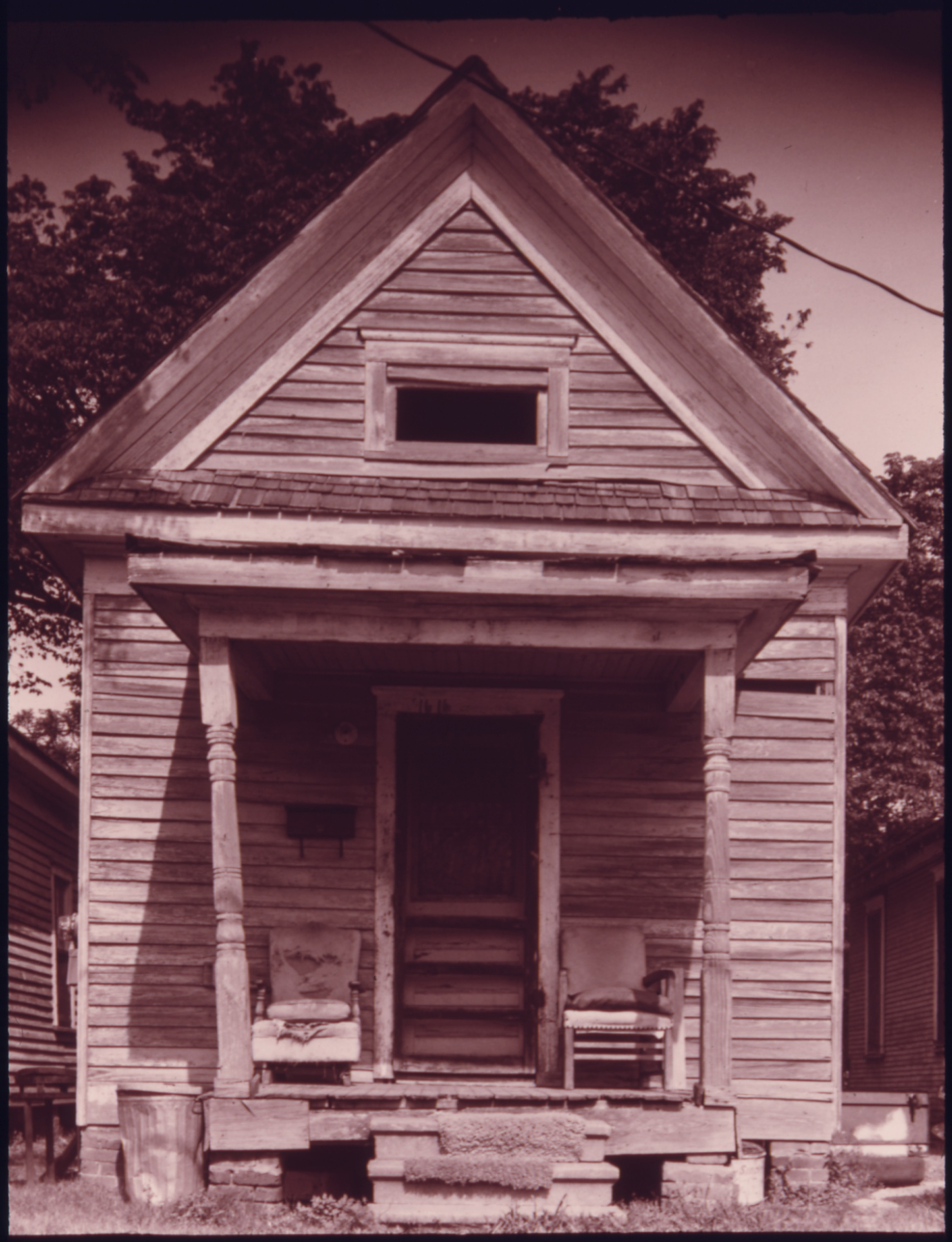
Shotgun house in the Fifth Ward neighborhood of Houston, Texas, 1973, as pictured in a photo by Danny Lyon.

A shotgun house is a narrow rectangular domestic residence, usually no more than about 12 feet (3.5 m) wide, with rooms arranged one behind the other and doors at each end of the house. It was the most popular style of house in the Southern United States from the end of the American Civil War (1861–1865) through the 1920s. Alternative names include shotgun shack, shotgun hut, shotgun cottage, and in the case of a multihome dwelling, shotgun apartment; the design is similar to that of railroad apartments.

A longstanding theory is that the style can be traced from Africa to Saint Dominican influences on house design in New Orleans, but the houses can be found as far away as Key West and Ybor City in Florida, and Texas, and as far north as Chicago, Illinois.

Although the term was at first used neutrally, the shotgun house became a symbol of poverty in the mid-20th century. Urban renewal led to the destruction of many shotgun houses; however, in areas affected by gentrification, historic preservation efforts have led to the renovation of such houses.

Several variations of shotgun houses allow for additional features and space, and many have been updated to the needs of later generations of owners. The oldest shotgun houses were built without indoor plumbing, which was often added later, often on the back of the house, sometimes crudely.

"Double-barrel" or "double" shotgun houses are a semi-detached configuration, consisting of two houses sharing a central wall, allowing more houses to be fit into an area. "Camelback" shotgun houses include a second floor at the rear of the house. In some cases the entire floor plan is changed during remodeling to create hallways.

== History ==
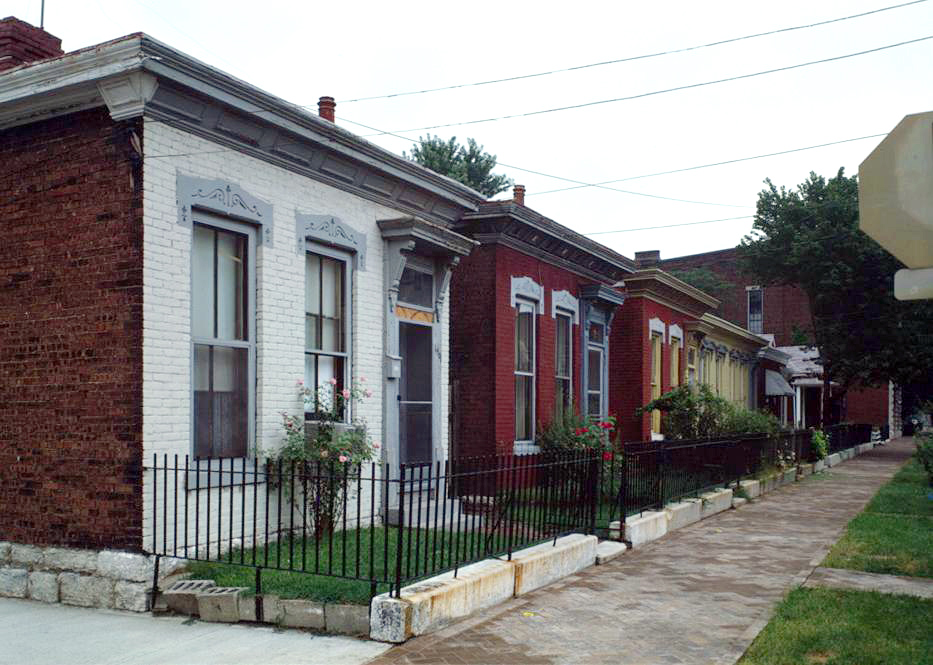
Shotgun houses in Louisville, Kentucky. In cities, shotgun houses were built close together for a variety of reasons.

The origins of both the term and the architectural form and development of the shotgun house are controversial, even more so in the wake of conflicting preservation and redevelopment efforts since Hurricane Katrina.

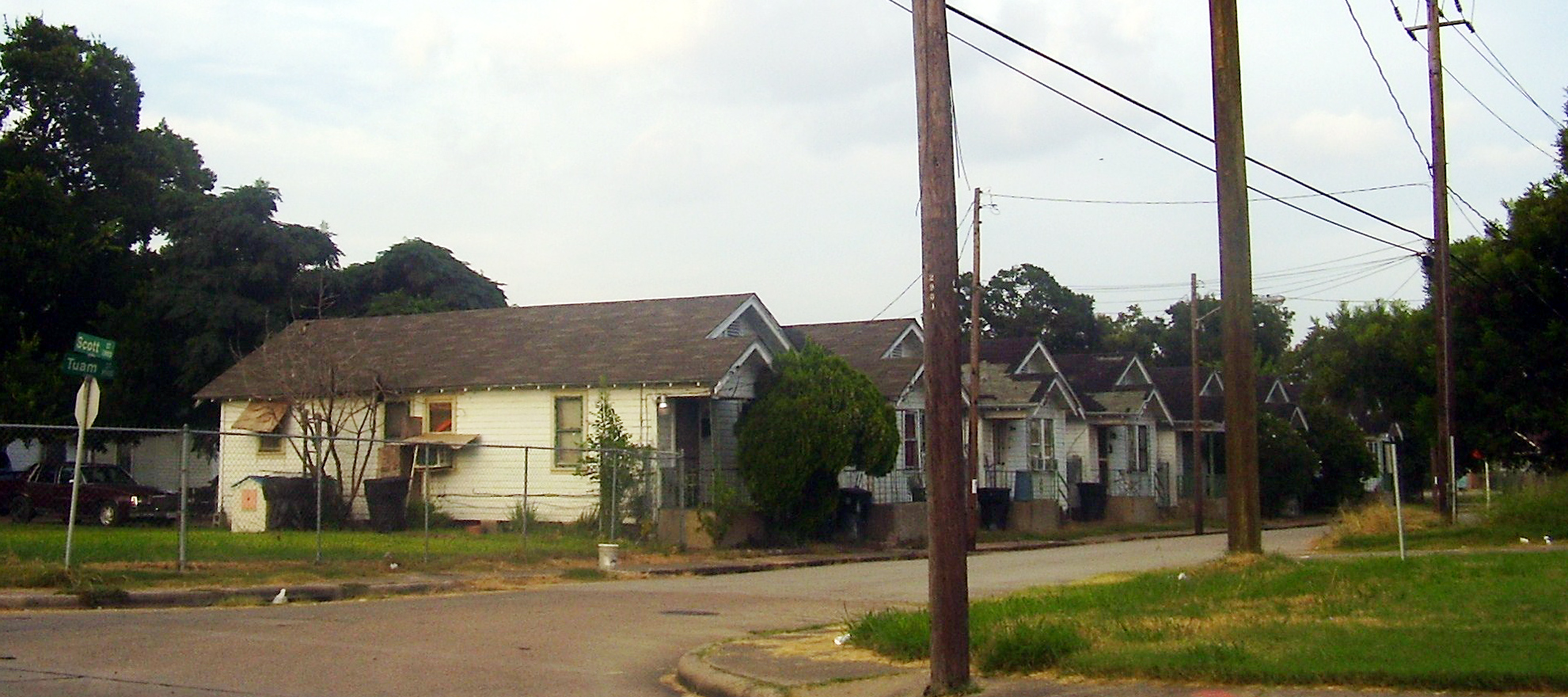
The portion of the Third Ward of Houston, Texas, north of Truxillo, has many shotgun shacks

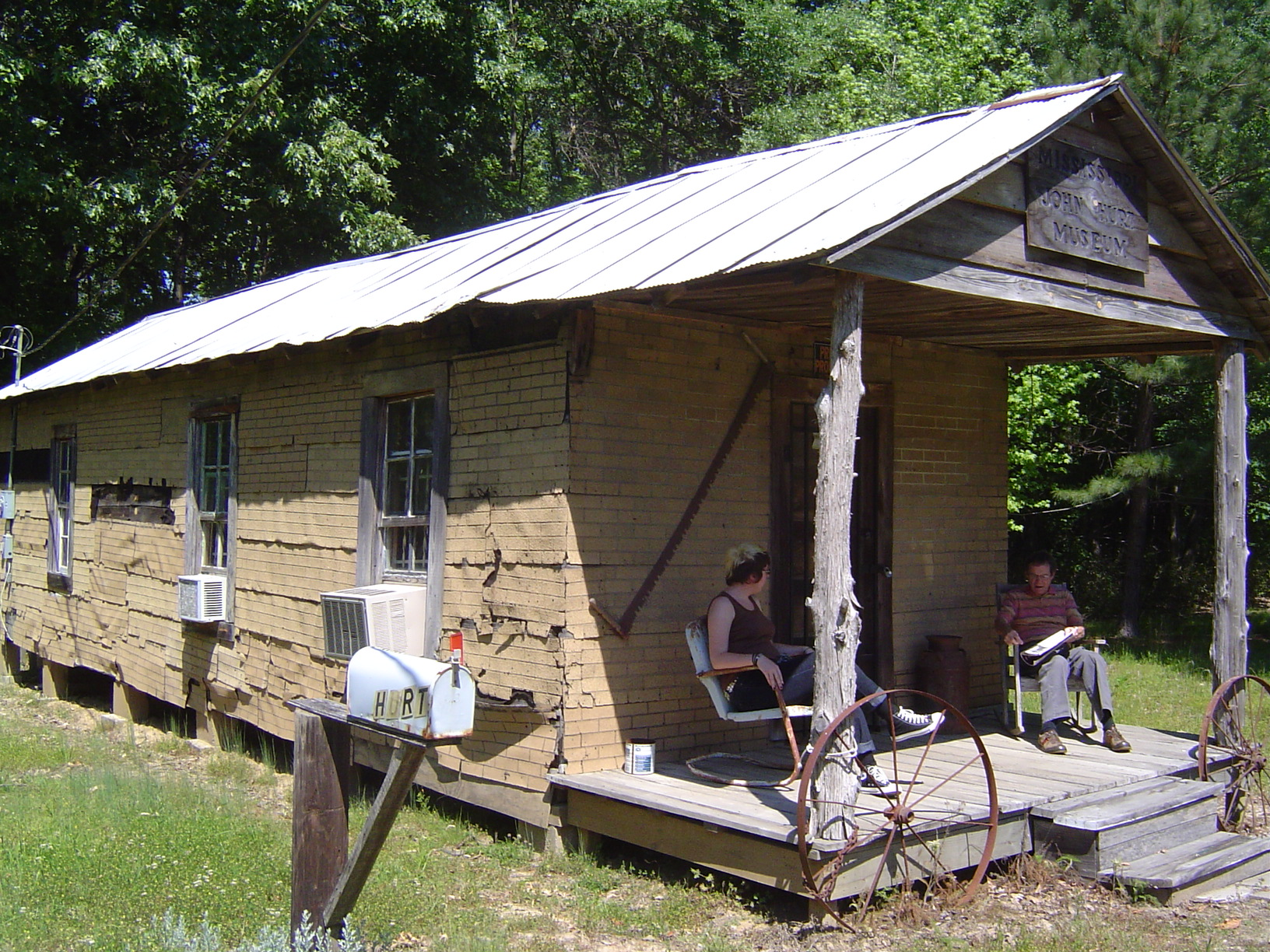
A single shotgun in Avalon, Mississippi, which was the house of Mississippi John Hurt. It was a museum before it burned down in 2024.

New Orleans architectural historian Samuel Wilson, Jr. influentially suggested that shotgun-style houses originated in the Creole suburbs (faubourgs) of New Orleans in the early 1800s. He also stated that the term "shotgun" is a reference to the idea that if all the doors are opened, a shotgun blast fired into the house from the front doorway will fly cleanly to the other end and out at the back.

Alternatively, folklorist and professor John Michael Vlach has suggested that the origin of the building style and the name itself may trace back to Haiti and Africa during the 18th century and earlier. Vlach claimed the name may have originated from a Dahomey Fon area term to-gun, which means 'place of assembly'. The description, probably used in New Orleans by Afro-Haitian slaves, may have been misunderstood and reinterpreted as "shotgun". Citing Vlach, James Deetz claimed archaeological support for an African origin in his dig at Parting Ways, a 1790s community of freed black slaves in Plymouth, Massachusetts; his shotgun interpretation of the extremely limited evidence – two rooms that "may or may not have been unified" – has been challenged as "premature". Vlach's theory behind the earlier African origin is tied to the history of New Orleans. In 1803 there were 1,355 free black people in the city. By 1810 black people outnumbered white people 10,500 to 4,500. This caused a housing boom. As many of both the builders and inhabitants were Africans by way of Haiti, Vlach maintained it was only natural they modeled the new homes after ones they left behind in their homeland. Many surviving Haitian dwellings of the period, including about 15 percent of the housing stock of Port-au-Prince, resemble the single shotgun houses of New Orleans.

The shotgun house was popularized in New Orleans, and, as Fred Kniffen documented in a statewide survey of Louisiana house types in the 1930s, the greatest number are found dispersed from there in a manner that supports the diffusion theory. The style was definitely built there by 1832, though there is evidence that houses sold in the 1830s were built 15 to 20 years earlier.

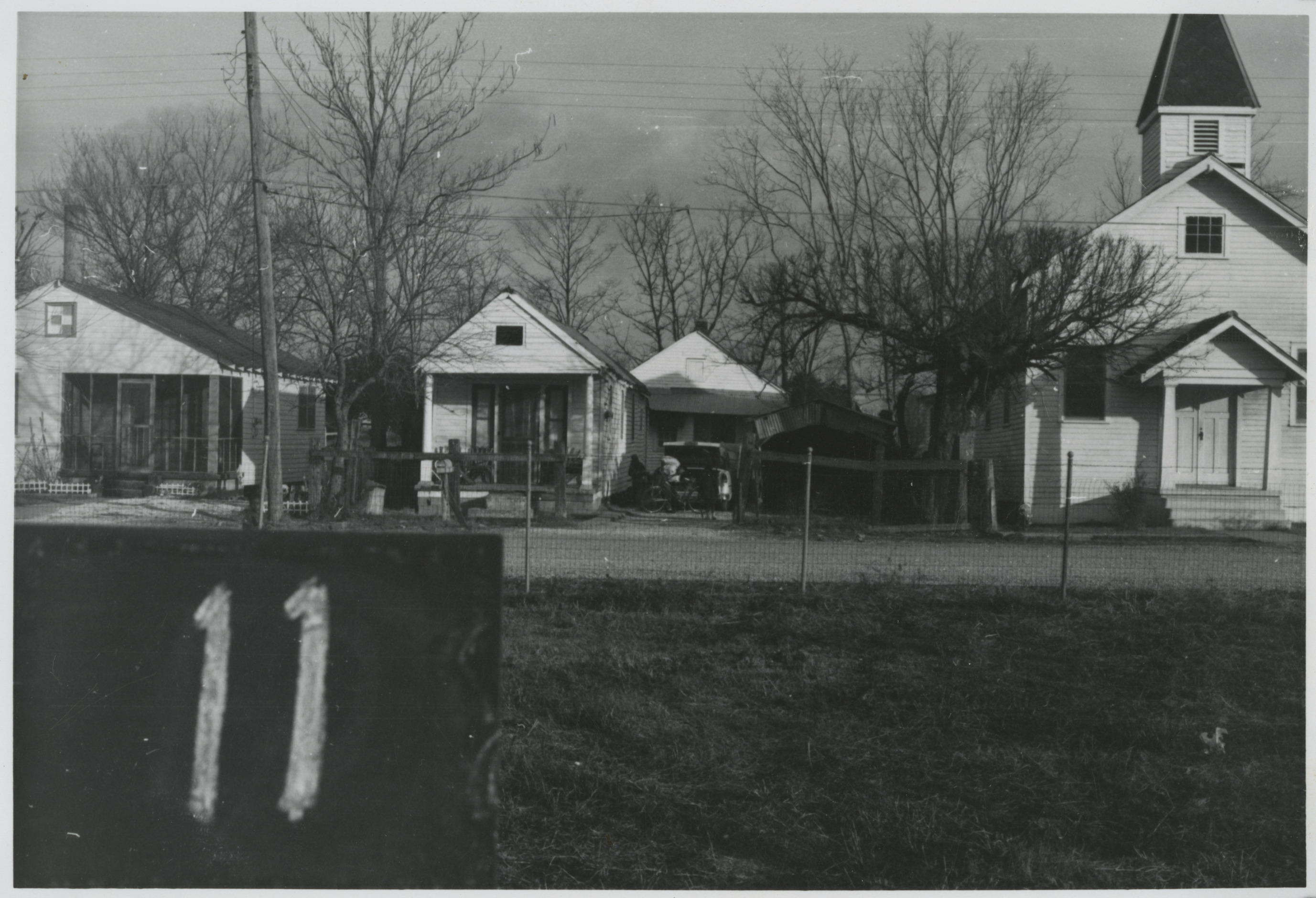
Battleground Baptist Church and neighboring shotgun-style houses, Fazendeville, Louisiana, 1960

Another theory is that they are the typical one-room-deep floor plan popular in the rural south, rotated to accommodate narrow city lots. Such houses were built throughout hot urban areas in the South, since the style's length and outside doors at each end allowed for excellent airflow, while its narrow frontage increased the number of lots that could be fitted along a street, as was the case with the shotgun homes in Fazendeville, Louisiana, a historic, African American village that was ultimately razed during the 1960s as part of the creation of the Chalmette National Historical Park and Battlefield (now part of the Jean Lafitte National Historical Park and Preserve). This style was used so frequently that some southern cities estimate that, even today, 10% or more of their housing stock is composed of shotgun houses.

The earliest known use of "shotgun house" as a name for these dwellings is in a classified advertisement in the Atlanta Journal-Constitution, August 30, 1903: "Two 3-room houses near the railroad yards at Simpson st. crossing, rent $12 a month to good tenants who pay in advance; price $1,200 on terms or $100 cash, balance $15 a month; a combination of investment and savings bank: these are not shacks, but good shot-gun houses in good repair." While this advertisement seems to present shotgun houses as a desirable working-class housing alternative, by 1929 a Tennessee court noted that shotgun houses could not be rented to any other than a very poor class of tenants. After the Great Depression few shotgun houses were built, and existing ones went into decline. By the late 20th century shotgun houses in some areas were being restored as housing and for other uses.

Shotgun houses were often initially built as rental properties, located near manufacturing centers or railroad hubs, to provide housing for workers. Owners of factories frequently built the houses to rent specifically to employees, usually for a few dollars a month. However, by the late 20th century shotguns were often owner-occupied. For example, 85% of the houses (many of them shotgun) in New Orleans' Lower Ninth Ward were owner-occupied.

Shotgun houses were most popular before widespread ownership of the automobile allowed people to live farther from businesses and other destinations. Building lots were small, 30 feet (9 m) wide at most. An influx of people to cities, both from rural areas in the US and from foreign countries, all looking to fill emerging manufacturing jobs, created the high demand for housing in cities. Shotgun houses were built to fulfill the same need as rowhouses in Northeastern cities. Several were often built at a time by a single builder, contributing to their similar appearance.

== Characteristics ==
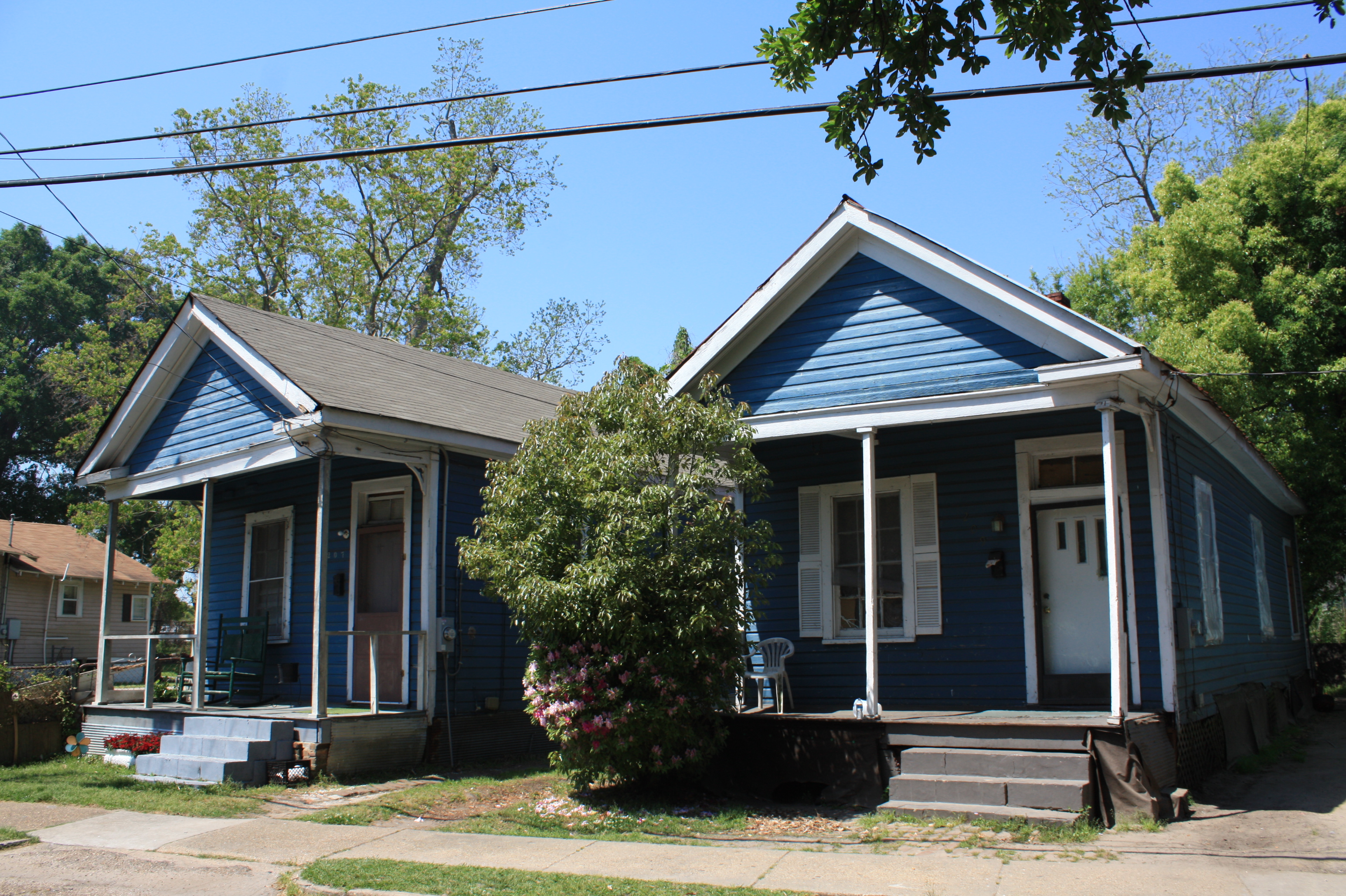
A pair of single shotgun houses, dating to the 1920s, in the Campground Historic District of Mobile, Alabama

The rooms of a shotgun house are lined up one behind the other, typically a living room is first, then one or two bedrooms, and finally a kitchen in back. Early shotgun houses were not built with bathrooms, but in later years a bathroom with a small hall was built before the last room of the house, or a side addition was built off the kitchen. Some shotguns have only two rooms.

Chimneys tended to be built in the interior, allowing the front and middle rooms to share a chimney with a fireplace opening in each room. The kitchen usually has its own chimney.

Other than the basic floor layout, shotgun houses have many standard features in common. The house is almost always close to the street, sometimes with a very short front yard. In some cases, the house has no setback and is actually flush with the sidewalk. The original steps were wood, but were often replaced with permanent concrete steps.

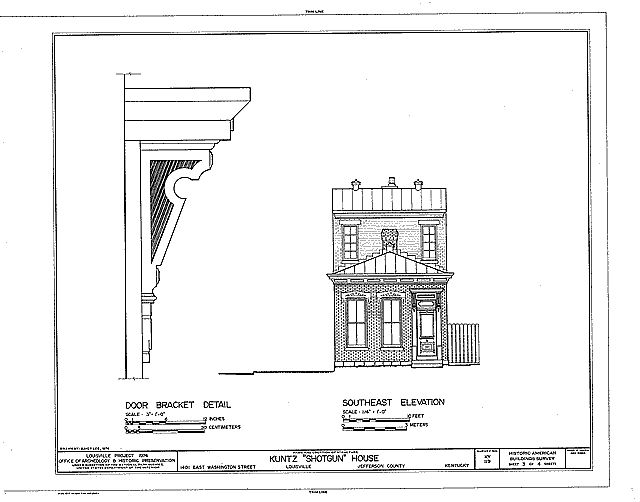
Sketch of a typical camelback, or 1 1/2-story, shotgun house, with a detailed sketch of a typical decorative wooden door bracket

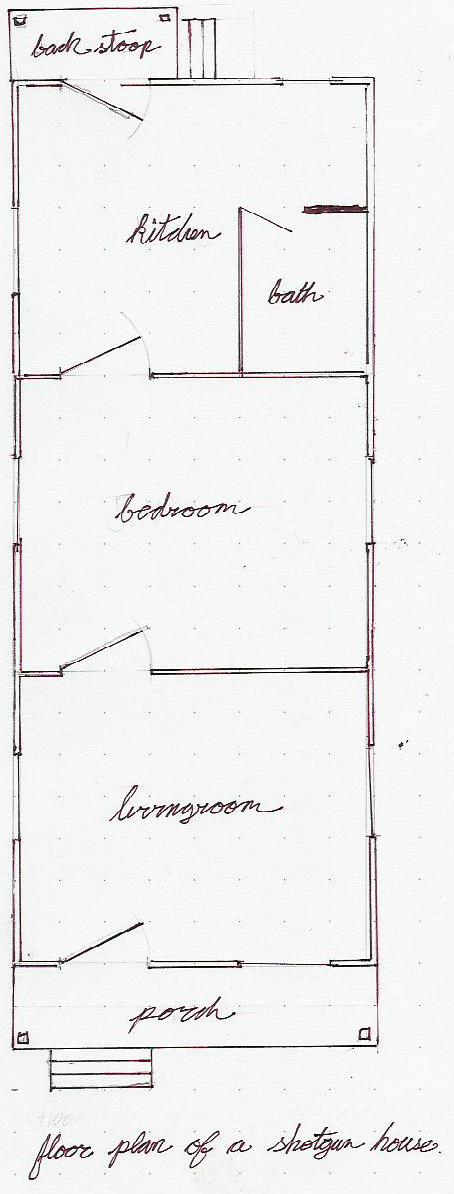
Floor plan of a typical single shotgun with bathroom

A sign of its New Orleans heritage, the house is usually raised two to three feet (60 to 90 cm) off the ground. There is a single door and window in the front of the house, and often a side door leading into the back room, which is slightly wider than the rest of the house. The front door and window often were originally covered by decorative shutters. Side walls may or may not have windows; rooms adjoining either the front or back door will generally have at least one window even when the houses are built very close together.

Typically, shotgun houses have a wood-frame structure and wood siding, although some examples exist in brick and even stone. Many shotguns, especially older or less expensive ones, have flat roofs that end at the front wall of the house. In houses built after 1880, the roof usually overhangs the front wall, and there is usually a gable above the overhang. The overhang is usually supported by decorative wooden brackets, and sometimes contains cast iron ventilators.

The rooms are well-sized, and have relatively high ceilings for cooling purposes, as when warm air can rise higher, the lower part of a room tends to be cooler. The lack of hallways allows for efficient cross-ventilation in every room. Rooms usually have some decoration such as moldings, ceiling medallions, and elaborate woodwork. In cities like New Orleans, local industries supplied elaborate but mass-produced brackets and other ornaments for shotgun houses that were accessible even to homeowners of modest means.

== Variations ==
The double shotgun requires less land per household than the traditional shotgun and was used extensively in poorer areas because it could be built with fewer materials and use less land per occupant. It was first seen in New Orleans in 1854.

A camelback house, also called humpback, is a variation of the shotgun that has a partial second floor over the rear of the house. Camelback houses were built in the later period of shotgun houses. The floor plan and construction is very similar to the traditional shotgun house, except there are stairs in the back room leading up to the second floor. The second floor, or "hump", contains one to four rooms. Because it was only a partial second story, most cities only taxed it as a single-story house – this was a key reason for their construction.

A combination, the Double Camelback shotgun, also exists. A minor variation is a side door allowing access to the kitchen, or a porch along the side extending almost the length of the house.

"North shore" houses are shotgun houses with wide verandas on three sides. They were so named because most were built on the north shore of New Orleans' Lake Pontchartrain as summer homes for wealthy whites.

== Decline and legacy ==
The construction of shotgun houses slowed and eventually stopped during the early 20th century. The increased affordability of two technological innovations, the car and consumer air conditioning units, made the key advantages of the shotgun house obsolete to home buyers. After World War II, shotgun houses had very little appeal to those building or buying new houses, as car-oriented modern suburbs were built en masse. Few shotgun houses have been built in the US since the war, although the concept of a simple, single-level floor plan lived on in ranch-style houses.

The surviving urban shotgun houses suffered problems related to those typically facing the inner city neighborhoods in which they were located. The flight of affluent residents to the suburbs, absentee owners, and a shortage of mortgage lenders for inner-city residents led to the deterioration of shotgun houses in the mid-to-late 20th century. Confusing ownership passed down within a family over several generations also contributed to many houses sitting vacant for years.

Though shotguns are sometimes perceived as being prevalent in poor African American neighborhoods, many originally constituted much of the housing stock of segregated white neighborhoods. Many of these neighborhoods became predominantly black during the 1950s and 1960s, but many others did not and remain predominantly white. Regardless of who was living in them, from World War II until the 1980s shotguns came to be widely viewed as substandard housing and a symbol of poverty, and they were demolished by many urban renewal projects. This thinking is no longer so prevalent, with such cities as Charlotte establishing "Shotgun Historic Districts". Shotgun houses have even been praised as quality and cost-effective cultural assets that promote a distinctive urban life. Other cities, such as Macon, Georgia, experimented with renovating shotgun houses for low-income residents and, though there was indecision whether it would be cheaper to tear them down and build new housing, some were rebuilt.

There are many large neighborhoods in older American cities of the south which still contain a high concentration of shotgun houses today. Examples include Third Ward in Houston; Bywater in New Orleans; The Hill in St. Louis; Portland, Butchertown and Germantown in Louisville; Cabbagetown in Atlanta and Village West of Coconut Grove in Miami where the last remaining 25 shotgun homes have been designated as historic structures. Their role in the history of the south has become recognized; for example, in October 2001 Rice University sponsored an exhibition called "Shotguns 2001". This three-day event featured lectures on and artistic paintings of the houses, as well as presentations and panel discussions in a neighborhood of restored shotguns.

In some shotgun-dominated neighborhoods, gentrification has led to property values becoming quite high. Sometimes, a new owner will buy both homes of a double-barreled shotgun structure and combine them, to form a relatively large single house. Shotguns are also often combined to renovate them into offices or storage spaces.

== Limited revival ==
Elements of the shotgun style have recently been seen in a number of the compact, low-occupancy structures employed in the Solar Decathlon contests held periodically in Washington, D.C. While some are erected from panels brought to the site, many such structures consist of enclosed single or multiple units designed specifically for road transports, with multiple modules connected on site, and compact linear structures often employ multiple-use "zones" rather than specifically private areas, while retaining a linear progression of spaces.

In 2011, Louisville's daily newspaper The Courier-Journal reported that a local nonprofit agency devoted to building and renovating affordable housing was building new shotgun houses in a development in southwest Louisville.

== Popular and Southern culture ==
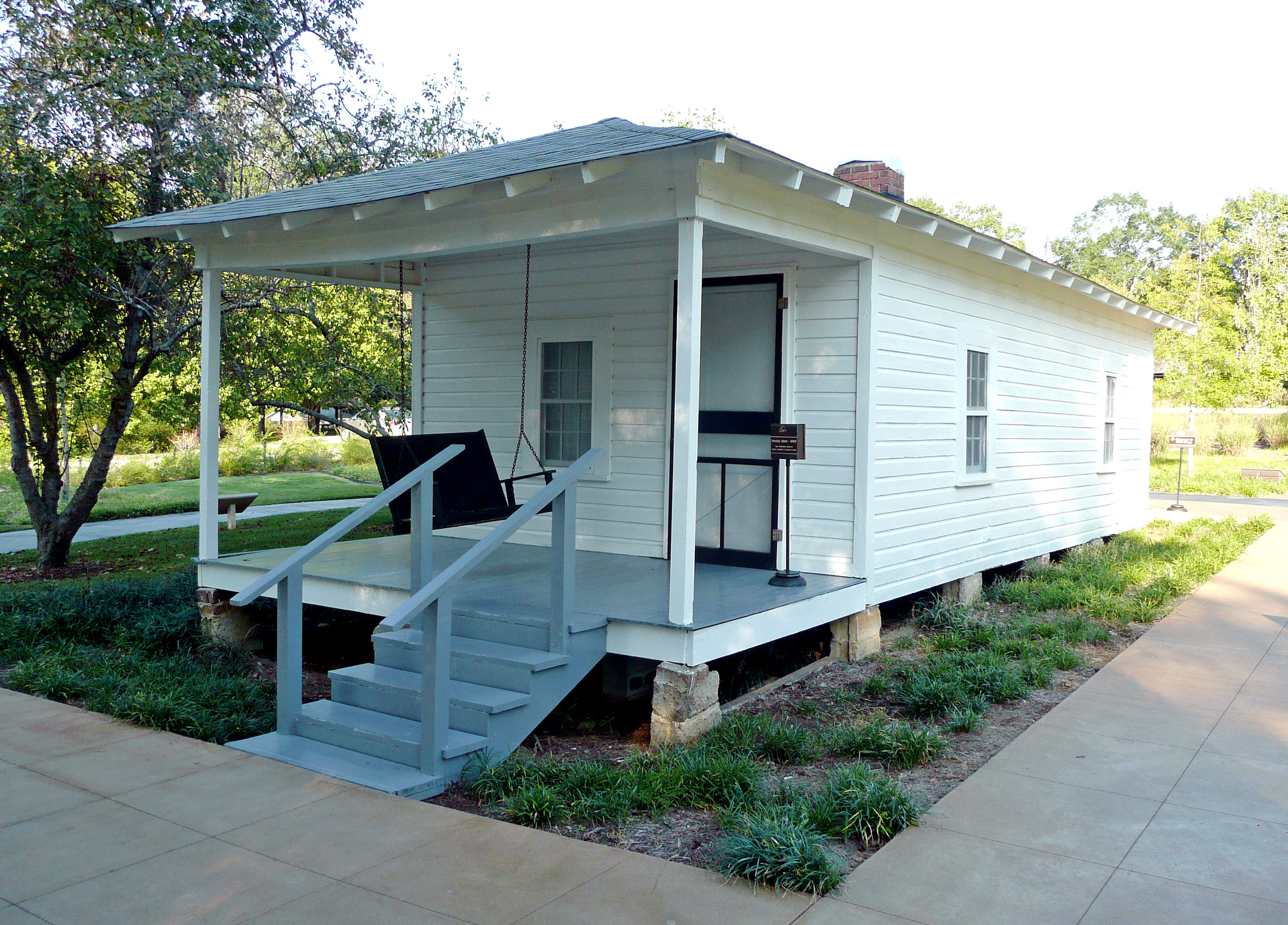
The shotgun house in Tupelo, Mississippi, in which Elvis Presley was born

The shotgun house plays a large role in the folklore and culture of the south. Superstition holds that ghosts and spirits are attracted to shotgun houses because they may pass straight through them, and that some houses were built with doors intentionally misaligned to deter these spirits. They also often serve as a convenient symbol of life in the south. Elvis Presley was born in a shotgun house, Aaron Neville of The Neville Brothers grew up in one, and according to bluesman David Honeyboy Edwards, Robert Johnson died in one. Shortly before his death in May 1997, Jeff Buckley rented a shotgun house in Memphis and was so enamoured with it he contacted the owner about the possibility of buying it. Dream Brother, David Browne's biography of Jeff and Tim Buckley, opens with a description of this shotgun house and Jeff's fondness of it.

One of the more widely known references to a shotgun house is in the 1980 Talking Heads song "Once In A Lifetime". The first line of the song is "And you may find yourself living in a shotgun shack".

The John Mellencamp song "Pink Houses" was inspired when he was driving along an overpass on the way home to Bloomington, Indiana from the Indianapolis airport. There was an old black man sitting outside his little pink shotgun house with his cat in his arms, completely unperturbed by the traffic speeding along the highway in his front yard. "He waved, and I waved back," Mellencamp said in an interview with Rolling Stone. "That's how 'Pink Houses' started.". In Bruce Springsteen's song "We Take Care of Our Own", from the album Wrecking Ball, he refers to shotgun houses, singing "We take care of our own, from the shotgun shack to the Super Dome". Springsteen also references "shotgun shack" in "Reason to Believe" from his 1982 album Nebraska, with the line, "In a whitewashed shotgun shack, an old man passes away / they take his body to the graveyard, and over him, they pray." In the Rolling Stones song "Little T&A" a Shotgun Shack is mentioned.

== Gallery ==
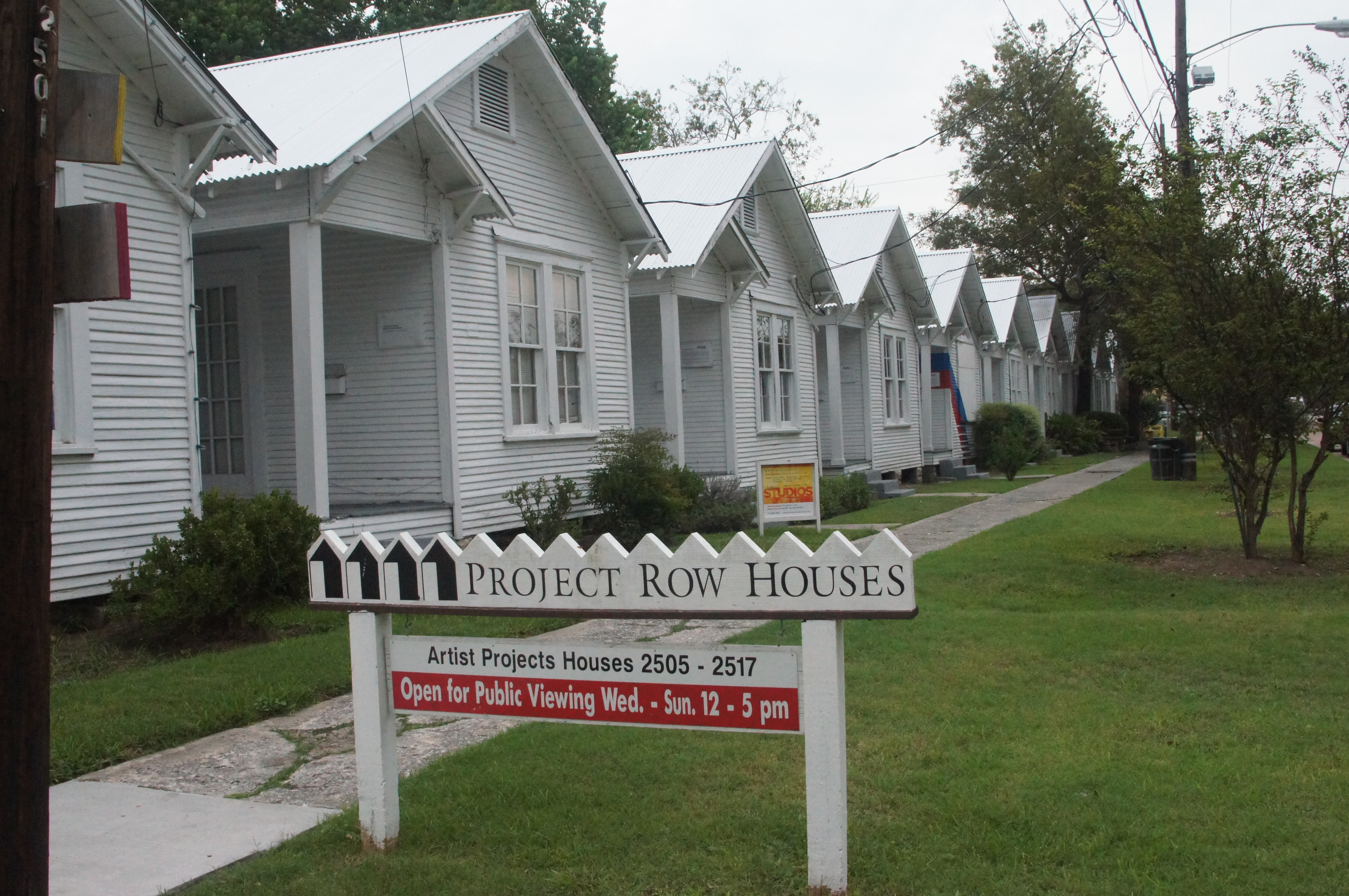
Project Row Houses in Third Ward Houston, Texas

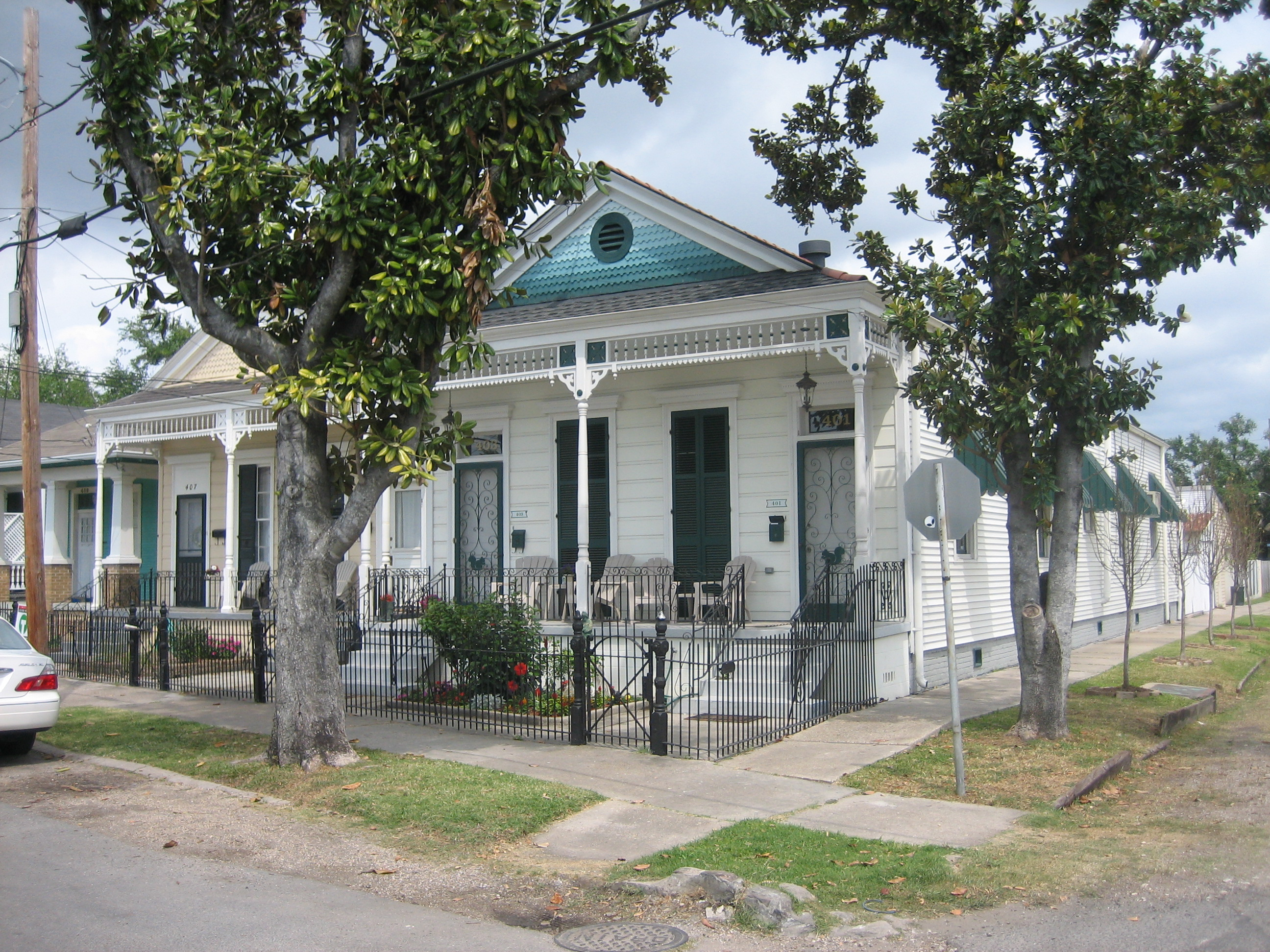
A double shotgun structure in the Uptown section of New Orleans. Double shotgun houses were a form of multiple-family housing, where essentially two conventional shotgun houses shared a central wall.

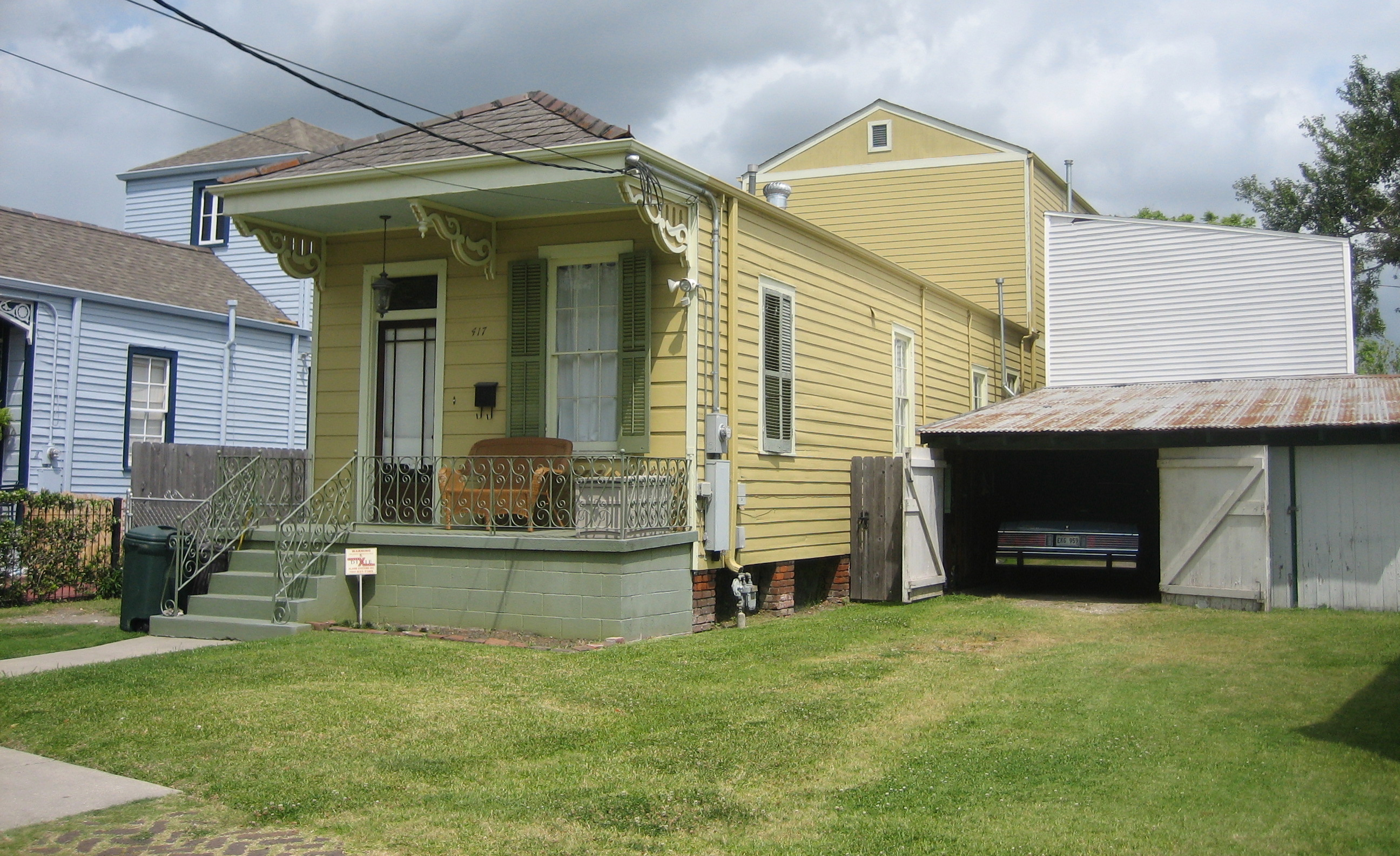
A classic camelback shotgun house in Uptown New Orleans

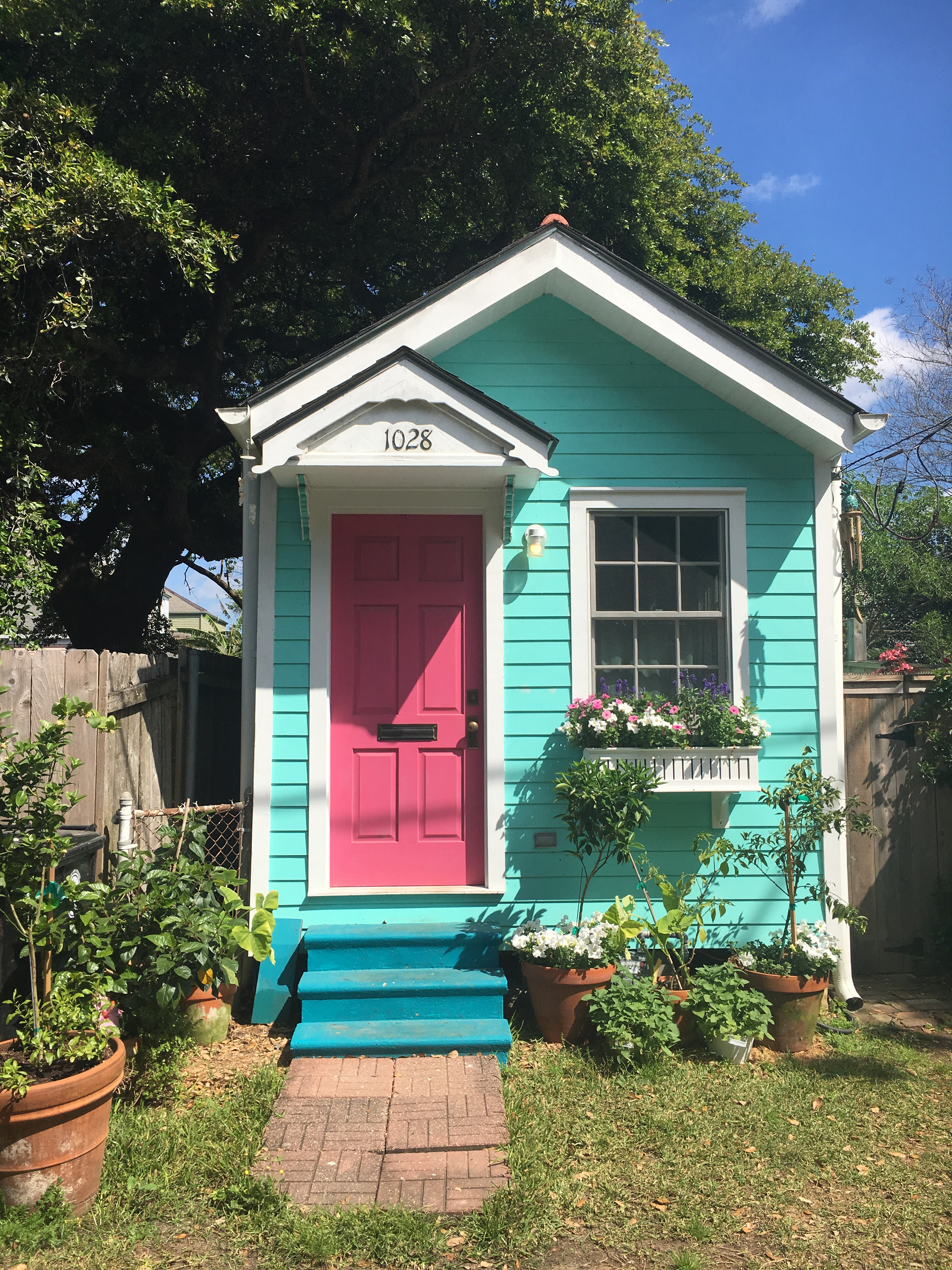
Shotgun house in New Orleans

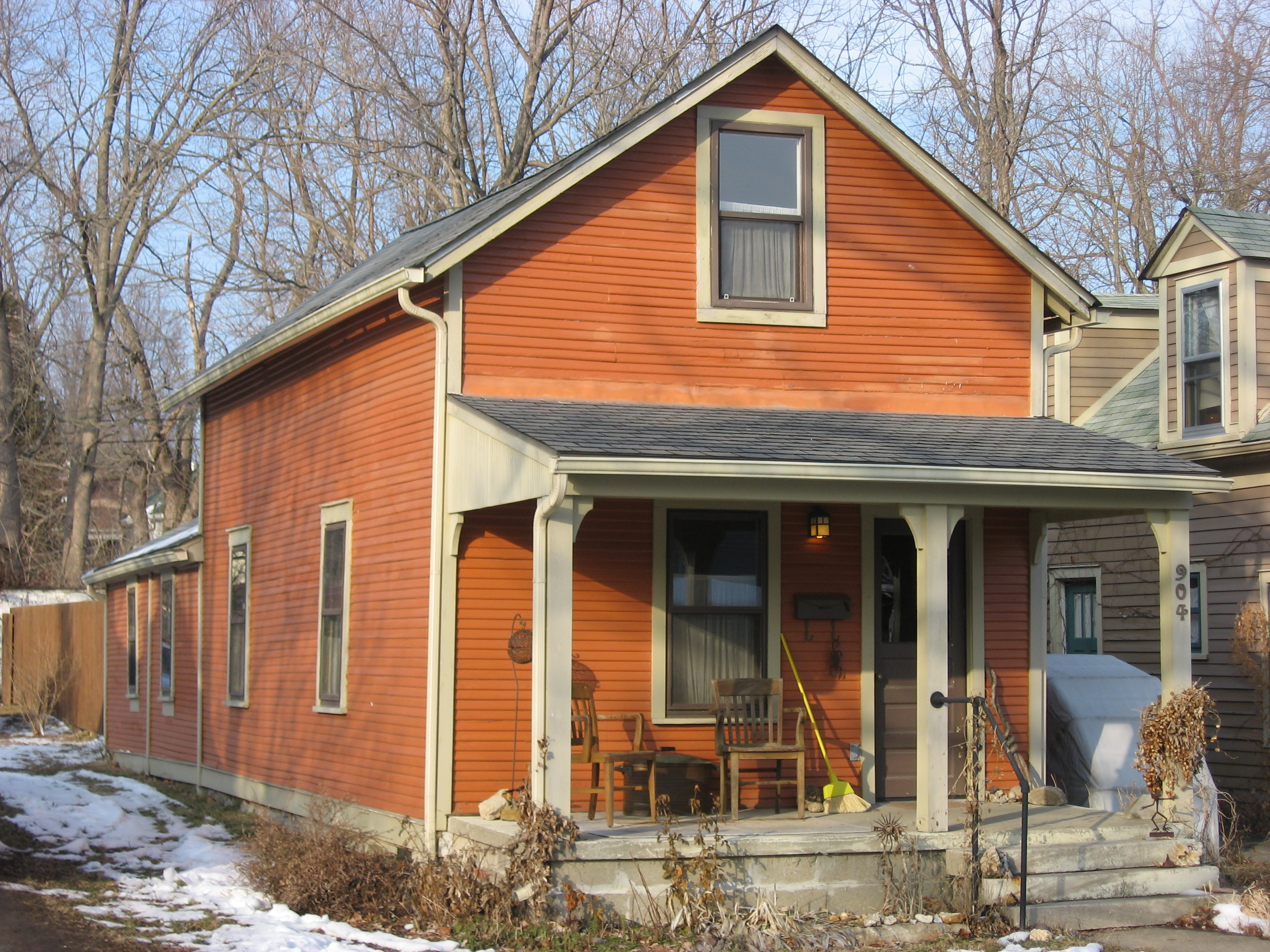
A single shotgun house in Bloomington, Indiana

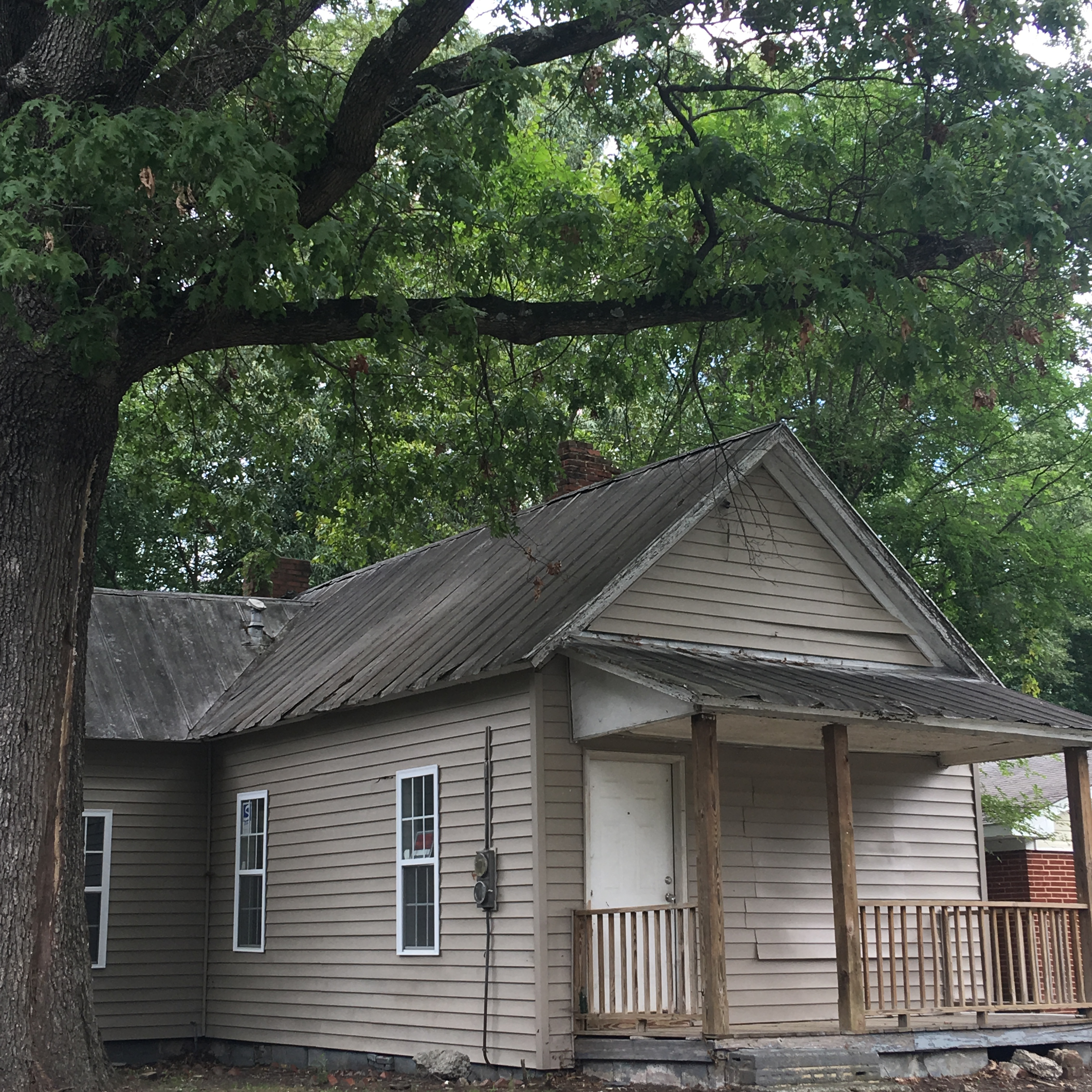
The George Wall House, an original shotgun home in Walltown, Durham, North Carolina

== See also ==
- Bach (New Zealand)
- Bathing machine
- Beach hut
- Boatshed
- Cabana
- Creole cottage
- Culture of the Southern United States
- Enfilade (architecture) – similar design in grand European architecture of the Baroque period
- Ine-ura
- List of house types
- Railroad apartment
- Shepherd's hut
- Terraced house
- Tiny house movement
- Tiny House, the 21st century successor to the shotgun shack
- Tube house, similar concept in Vietnam
- Vardo (Romani wagon)
