= Ellerbe Creek =

Stream in North Carolina, USA

Ellerbe Creek Tributary to Neuse River
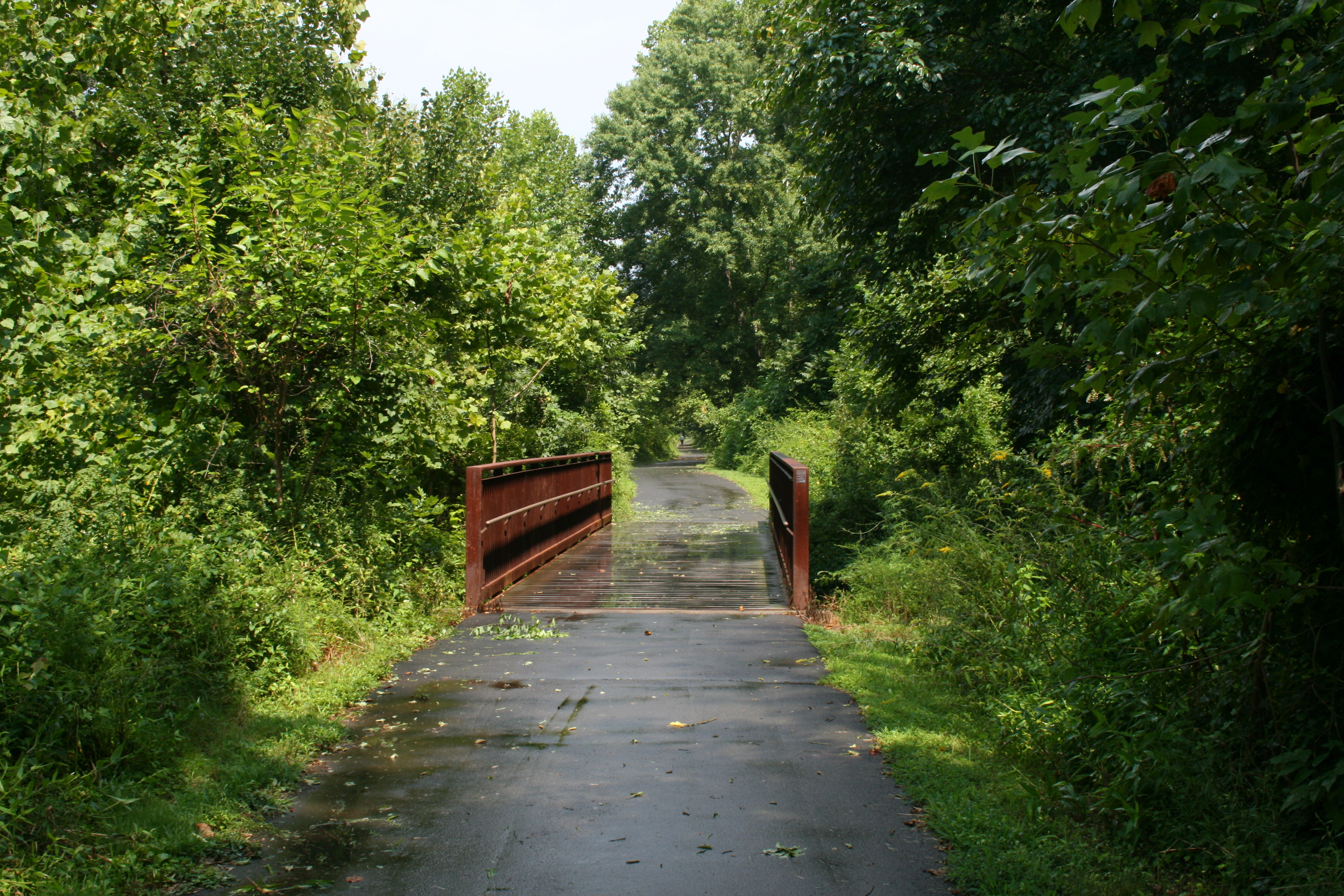
- A wooden bridge over a tributary on the western part of the Ellerbe Creek Trail

- Location of Ellerbe Creek mouth

Location
- Country: United States
- State: North Carolina
- County: Durham

Physical characteristics
- Source: divide between Ellerbe Creek and Eno River
  - location: Durham, North Carolina
  - coordinates: 36°01′32″N 078°58′25″W
  - elevation: 460 ft (140 m)
- Mouth: Neuse River (Falls Lake)
  - location: Durham, North Carolina
  - coordinates: 36°04′15″N 078°47′06″W
  - elevation: 252 ft (77 m)
- Length: 13.04 mi (20.99 km)
- Basin size: 66.96 square miles (173.4 km^{2})
- Discharge
  - location: Neuse River (Falls Lake)
  - average: 51.79 cu ft/s (1.467 m^{3}/s) at mouth with Neuse River

Basin features
- Progression: east
- River system: Neuse River
- Tributaries
  - left: unnamed tributaries
  - right: unnamed tributaries

Ellerbe Creek is a tributary of the Neuse River in North Carolina, USA. It is part of the Neuse River Basin, and flows for more than twenty miles through North Durham. The Ellerbe's watershed begins near Orange County north of Interstate 85, near the WDNC radio tower and Bennett Place. The creek flows through many of Durham's most historic and culturally significant areas, including Ninth Street, Downtown Durham, beneath Durham Athletic Park, The North Carolina School of Science and Mathematics, the Museum of Life and Science, the old Durham Landfill, Duke University East Campus, Trinity Park, Walltown, Northgate Mall, and towards the end crosses Fishdam Road. The Ellerbe eventually flows into Falls Lake, about a mile south of the Eno River.

It has been cited as the most polluted creek in The Triangle region of North Carolina. A watershed improvement plan was prepared by the Brown and Caldweld firm for the City of Durham in 2010.

Some say Ellerbe is a name derived from a Native American language, while others believe the creek is named after John Ellerby, an early settler.

== See also ==
- List of North Carolina rivers
- Eno River
- Ellerbe Creek Trail
