= George Wall House =

House in Durham, North Carolina

Coordinates: 36°0′52.3″N 78°54′52.6″W

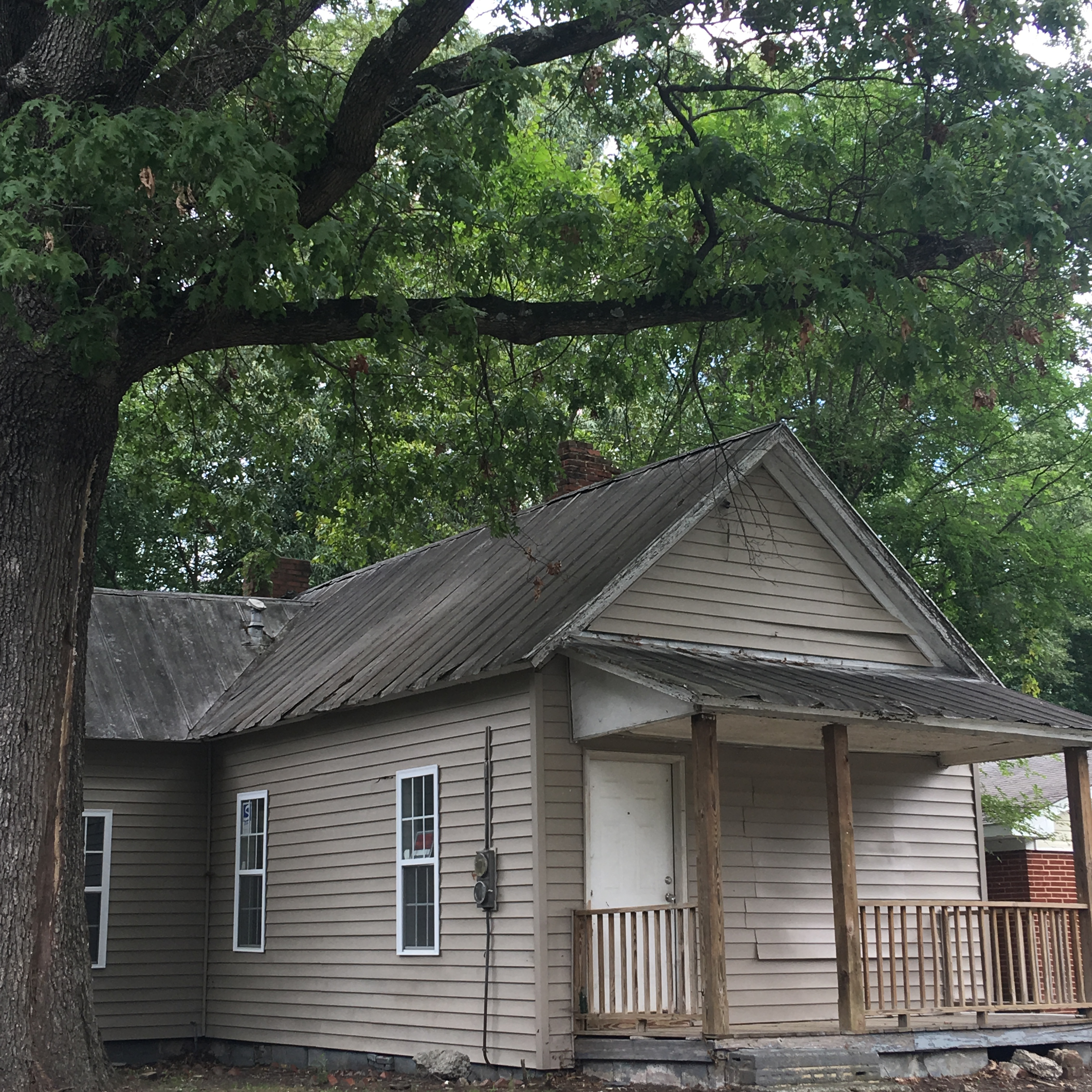
- Interactive map of the George Wall House area

General information
- Status: Uninhabited
- Type: private residence
- Architectural style: Shotgun
- Location: 1015 Onslow Street; Durham, North Carolina, U.S.
- Completed: 1906
- Owner: Wall family

The George Wall House, also called Old Man Wall's House, is a historic shotgun house in the Walltown Neighborhood in Durham, North Carolina.

== History ==
On July 21, 1899, George Wall purchased a lot from the West End Land Company in Durham, North Carolina. Wall, a former slave, was a service worker at the nearby Trinity College (later Duke University). He purchased a second lot, next door, on April 2, 1906. The house was completed some time in 1906 and is built in the original shotgun style with an el edition and tin roof. By 1923 the area in which Wall had settled became known as Walltown, in honor of him. The house is currently vacant and in disrepair, but is still owned by the Wall family.
