= Railroad apartment =

Building layout

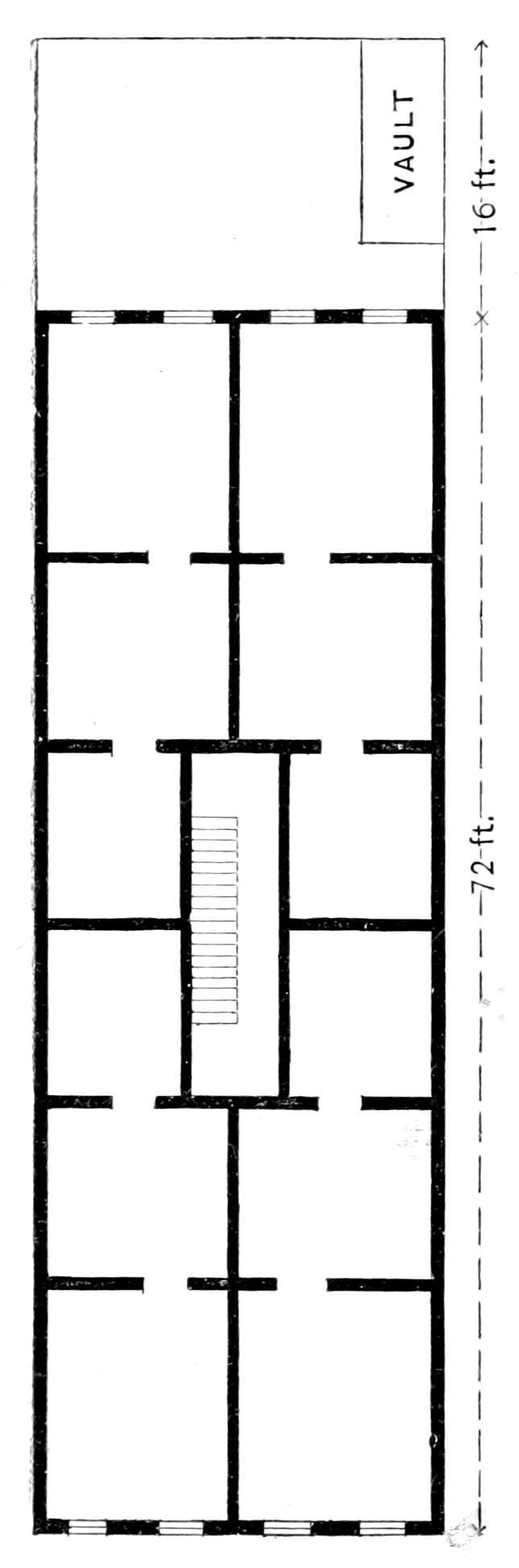
A tenement of the old style, from Jacob Riis, How the Other Half Lives (1890)

A railroad apartment or railroad flat, sometimes referred to as a floor-through apartment, is an apartment with a series of rooms connecting to each other in a line. The name comes from the layout's similarity to that of a typical (mid-20th century or earlier) passenger train car. Without hallways, it results in less semi-public space.

This style is most common in New York City, San Francisco, and their surrounding areas. Railroad apartments are common in tenement buildings or even modern apartment blocks, and are sometimes found in subdivided brownstones.

Railroad apartments first appeared in New York City in the mid-19th century, and were designed to provide a solution to urban overcrowding. Many early railroad apartments were extremely narrow, and most buildings were five or six stories high. Few early buildings had internal sanitation, and bathrooms emptied raw sewage into the back yard. In some cases, one family would take up residence in each room, with the exterior hallway providing communal space.

== Floor-through apartment ==
A floor-through apartment is an apartment that extends from the front of the building to the rear of the building, usually with front and back windows, even if it does not occupy the width of the full floor.

== See also ==
- Enfilade (architecture) – similar design in grand European architecture of the Baroque period
- List of house types
- Shotgun house
