= Ellerbe Creek Trail =

Greenway in Durham, North Carolina

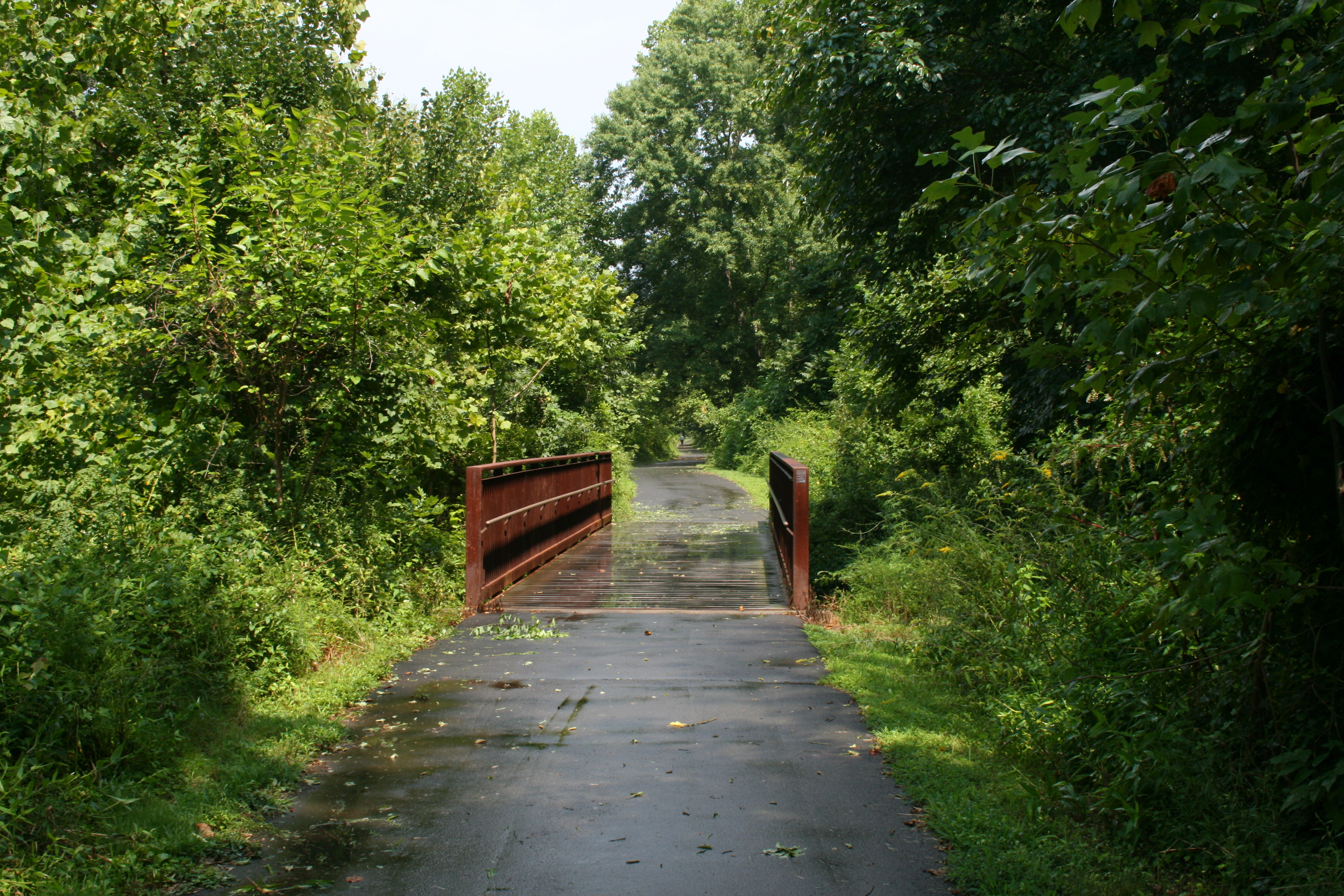
A wooden bridge over a tributary on the western part of the trail.

Ellerbe Creek Trail is a pedestrian and bicycle greenway located in Durham, North Carolina. From downtown Durham, the trail runs along South Ellerbe Creek from Trinity Avenue to the corner of Washington Street and Club Boulevard. It then follows the sidewalk from Club Boulevard and Washington Street to Northgate Park where it turns back into a pedestrian and bicycle greenway. From Northgate park, it continues on to Stadium Drive.

The trail is part of the planned East Coast Greenway. Ellerbe Creek Trail contributes approximately 4 miles to the East Coast Greenway.

Technically, the Ellerbe Creek Trail is a group of shorter trails. The shorter trails as defined by The Durham Open Space and Trails Commission are known as follows:

- Ellerbe Creek Trail: Durham Co. Stadium to Northgate Park
- S. Ellerbe Creek Trail: Northgate Park to Trinity Ave.
- Stadium Drive Trail: Durham Co. Stadium to Whippoorwill Park

Ellerbe Creek trail connects to the Warren Creek Trail on the northern side of the greenway and the southern side, the Downtown Trail which eventually connects to the American Tobacco Trail (ATT) Trailhead at Morehead Ave.

== See also ==
- Ellerbe Creek Trail at HTYP
