= Walltown, Durham, North Carolina =

Neighborhood in Durham, North Carolina

Walltown
- Durham neighborhood
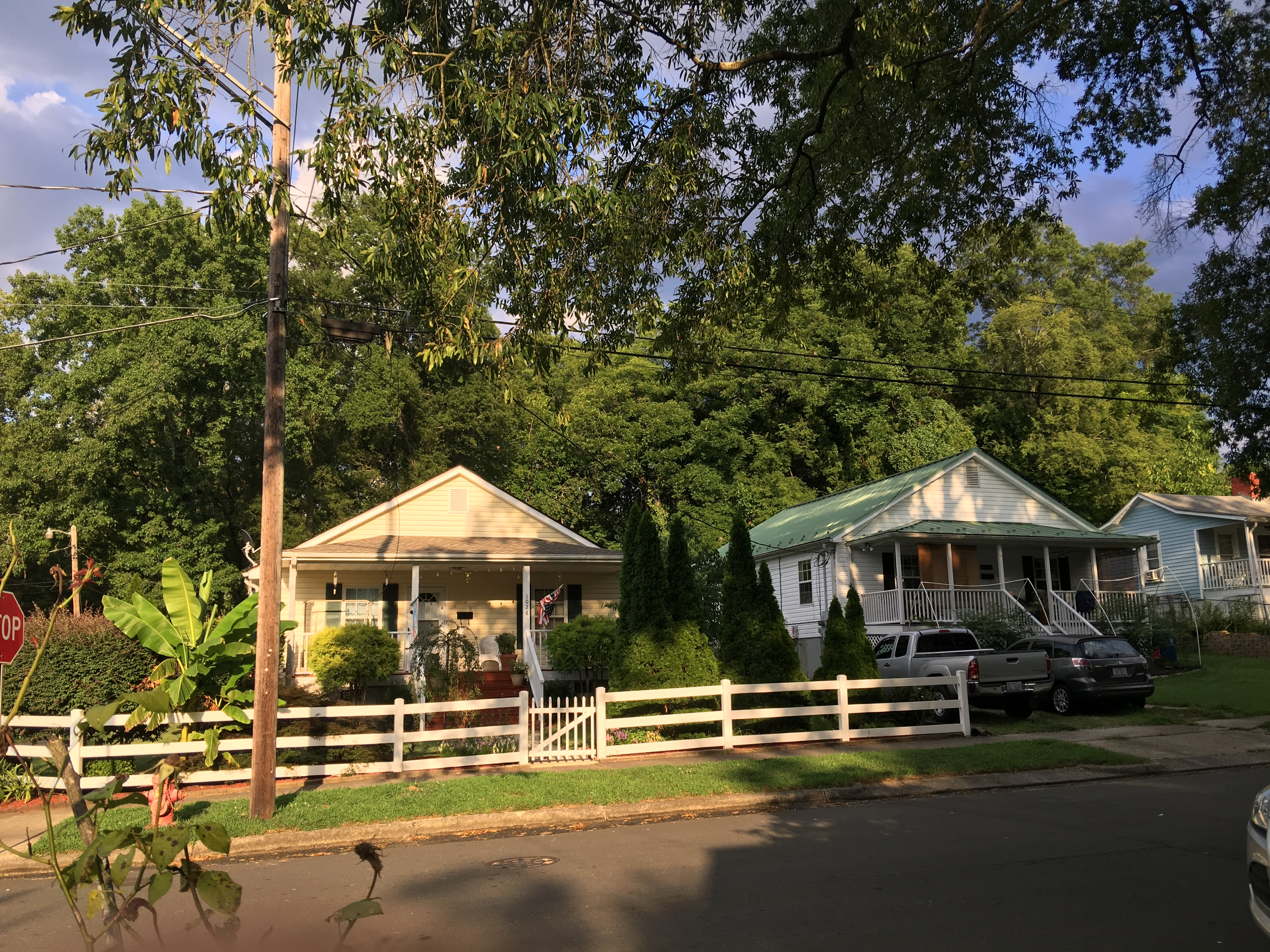
- Houses on Berkeley Street in Walltown.
- Country: United States
- State: North Carolina
- City: Durham
- Named for: George Wall
- Time zone: EST
- Postal code: 27705

Walltown is a historically African-American neighborhood in Durham, North Carolina. It is located between West Durham Historic District and Trinity Historic District, north of Duke University East Campus. Historically, the neighborhood was a working class neighborhood for African-American employees of Duke University and local tobacco and textile mills in Durham. Walltown was named after George Wall, a former enslaved person, who was one of the first people to purchase a lot in the area. Members of the community were active in the civil rights movement and desegregation in Durham. Since the beginning of the twenty-first century, Walltown has been undergoing gentrification.

== Location ==
Walltown is a historically African-American, working class neighborhood. Located north of Duke University's East Campus, it originally served as a residential neighborhood for service employees of the university and local tobacco and textile mills. It is bordered by West Durham Historic District and Watts–Hillandale Historic District to the west and Trinity Historic District to the east. Northgate Mall is located on the northeastern edge of the neighborhood. A low-lying area, the neighborhood is subject to flash flooding. Dye Branch, a section of Neuse River's tributary Ellerbe Creek, flows through Walltown.

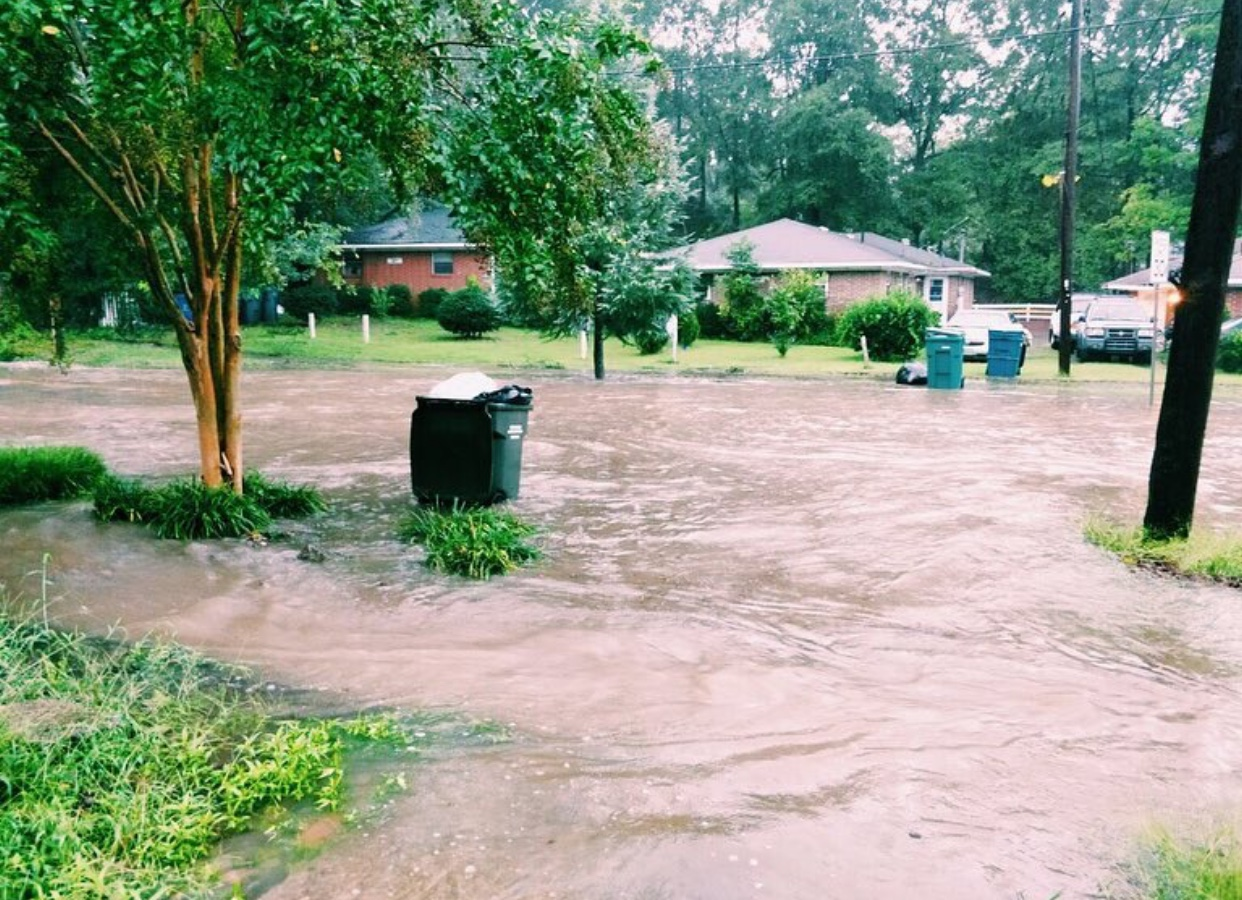
Floodwaters from Hurricane Florence on Buchanan Boulevard, between Trinity Park and Walltown, in September 2018.

== History ==
=== Foundation and Jim Crow ===
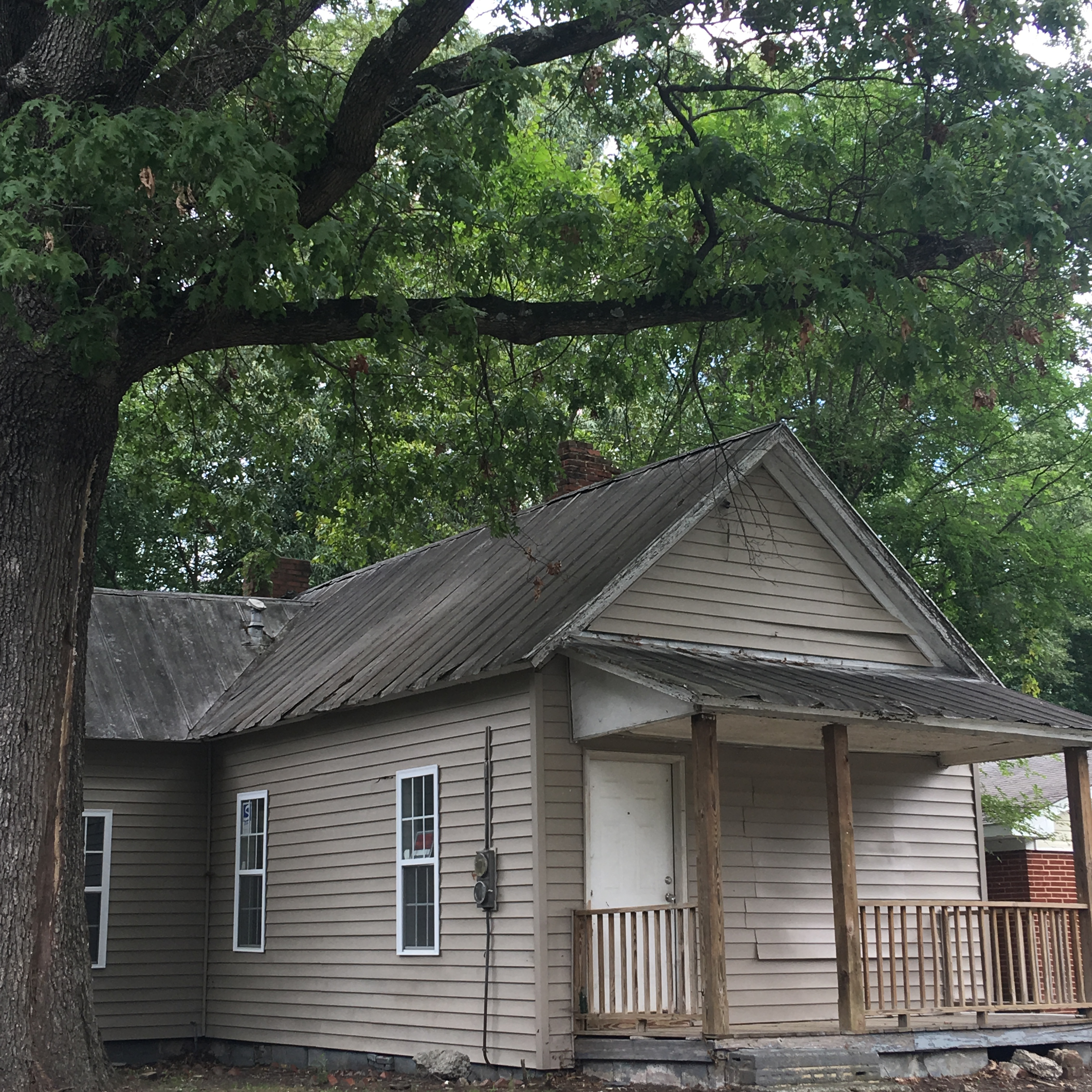
George Wall House on Onslow Street.

Walltown is named after George Wall (1854–1930), a formerly enslaved man who worked as a custodian at Trinity College (later renamed Duke University). Wall, born a slave to the grandfather of a Trinity College physics professor, worked as a farm laborer before obtaining his freedom. Wall and his family settled near the college after its relocation to Durham from Trinity and purchased a lot nearby, building a house in 1906. The area expanded and became known as Walltown, serving as a residential neighborhood for service staff at Duke University and workers at the local tobacco mills. In 1910 the first church was built in the neighborhood and named Wall Street Baptist Church, in honor of Wall.

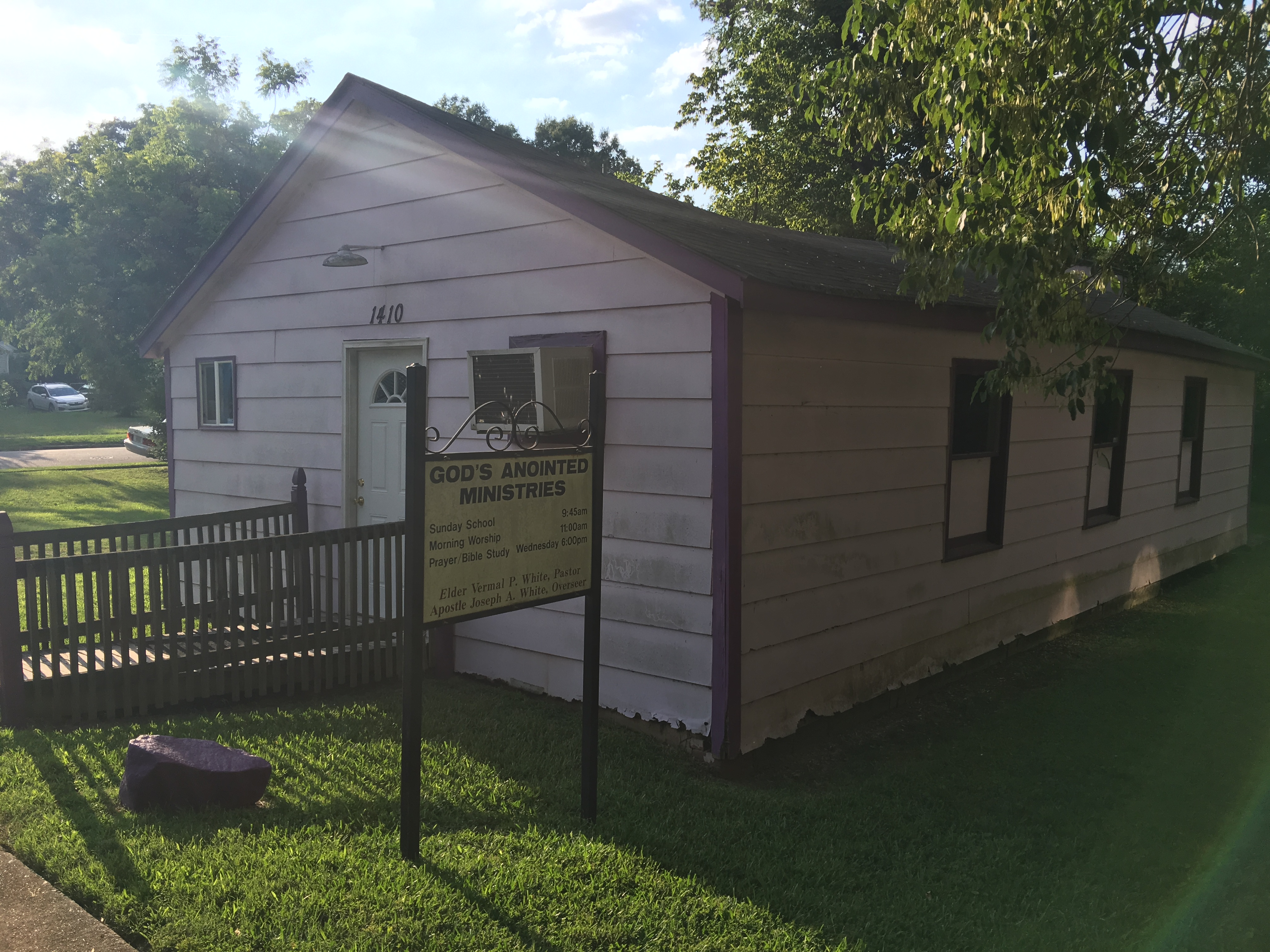
A small church on Englewood Avenue.

In 1948 two female residents, who were members of the Durham Negro Youth Federation, led a door-to-door voter registration drive in Walltown and Hickstown to encourage African-American citizens to vote in an election for Durham County Commissioner in which one of the candidates was an African-American. In 1937 the Walltown Community Council was formed and two years later had an all-female leadership team. In 1955 Walltown residents awarded Frizelle Daye a gold plate, presented by Rev. L.M. Gooch, and appointed him the "Bronze Mayor". Daye's wife, Callie, was a local beautician and head of the Walltown Housewives League in the 1940s and 1950s. She wrote a column for The Carolina Times titled Walltown Notes. She later chaired the Durham NAACP's membership drive in the 1960s.

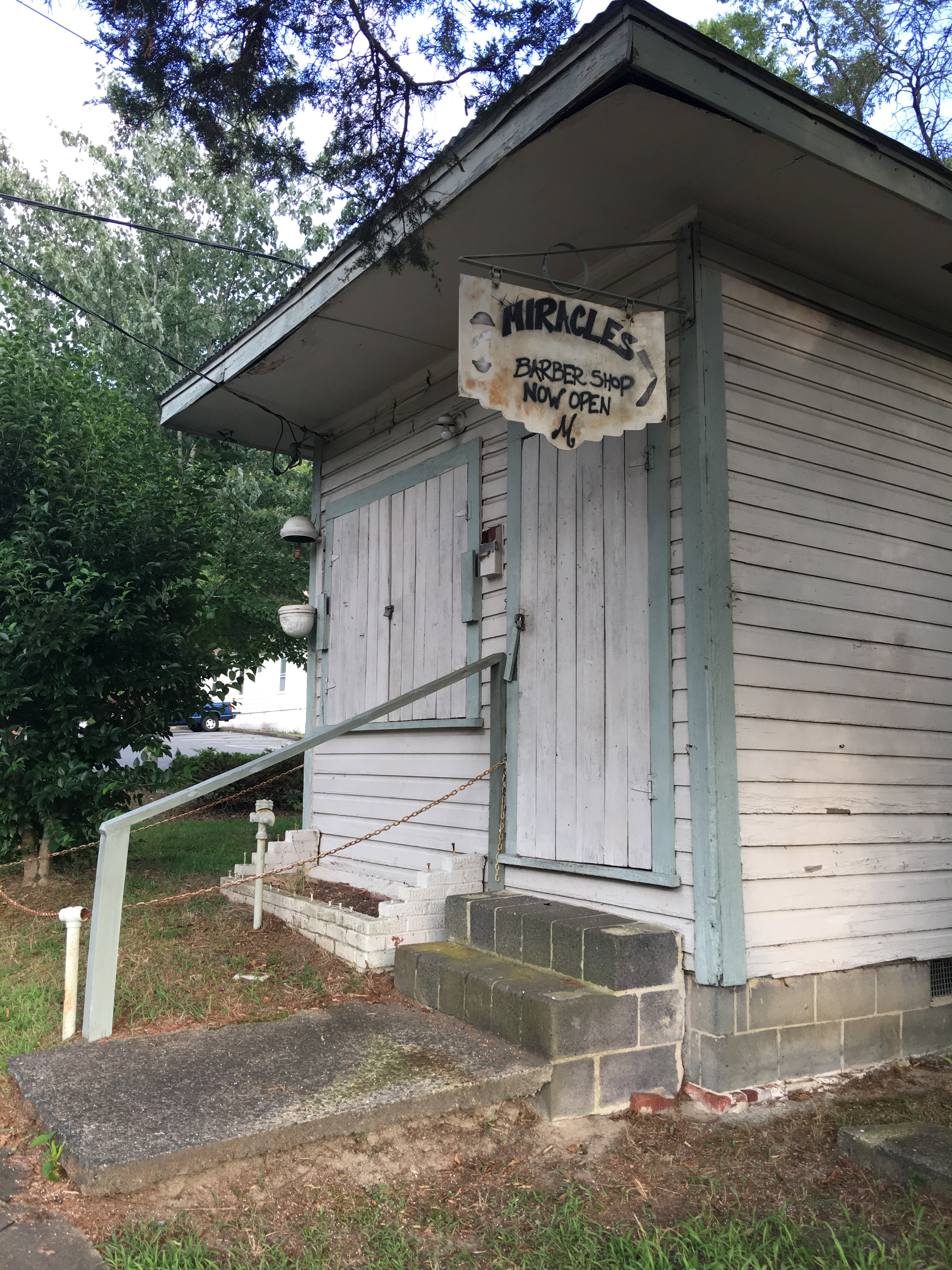
An old barber shop on Knox Street.

In May 1958 the first legal challenge against racial segregation in Durham Public Schools was filed by Rachel Richardson, a resident of Walltown, and Evelyn McKissick, wife of Floyd McKissick. Many of the anti-segregation protesters in Durham were residents of Walltown.

==== Walltown School ====
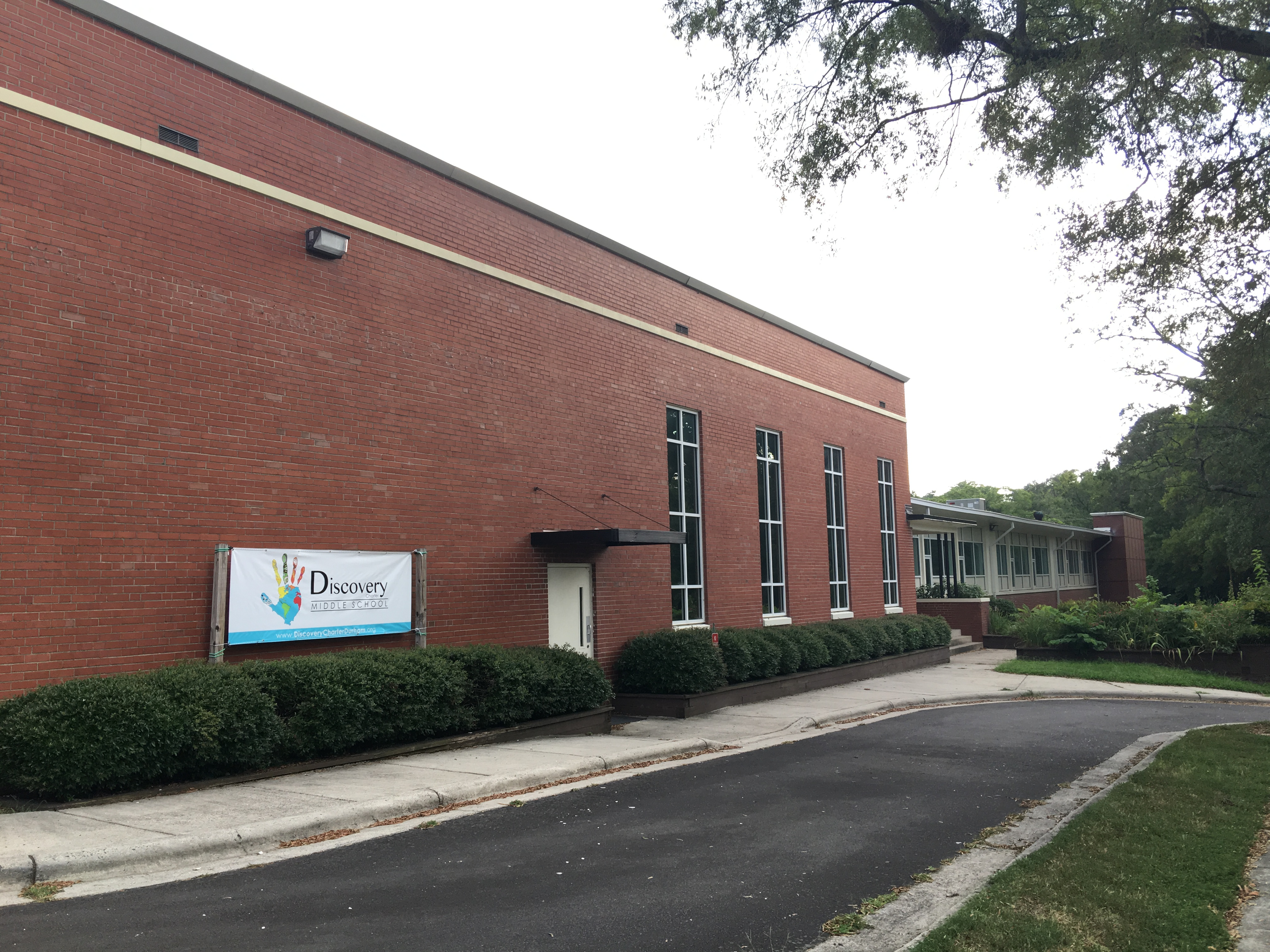
Discovery Charter School in the former St. James Family Life Center building in 2019.

In 1919 the Walltown Graded School was built on North Road (later West Club Boulevard). A Rosenwald School, it served African-American children in the neighborhood. The school building was expanded in 1945. In 1955 the original building was demolished and replaced. During desegregation, some African-American students were reassigned from Walltown to Brogden Junior High School. White students were not enrolled at Walltown School until 1970. The school later closed and the property ownership was transferred to the Durham County government in 1994. In 1997 the property was listed for sale. St. James Baptist Church bought the building for $374,240 and, with assistance from Self-Help and Duke University, created the St. James Family Life Center. The building was acquired by Discovery Charter School, a STEM-based school, in 2019.

=== Modern era ===
Walltown developed into an epicenter of crime and poverty and began experiencing high vacancy rates in the 1970s. By the 1980s, Walltown's poverty, unemployment, and crime rates exceeded the city average. A mini-mart on Knox Street became a drug trafficking hub in the neighborhood. Walltown became a center of gang violence and drug trade. In 1990, seventy-three percent of the homes in Walltown were rental properties rather than owner occupied properties. In 1994 the Center for Community Self-Help commenced a large scale housing renovation program in the neighborhood. In 1996 the Walltown Neighborhood Ministries formed, made up of local ministers, to provide community outreach. In 1998 seventy-nine percent of residents lived below the poverty line.

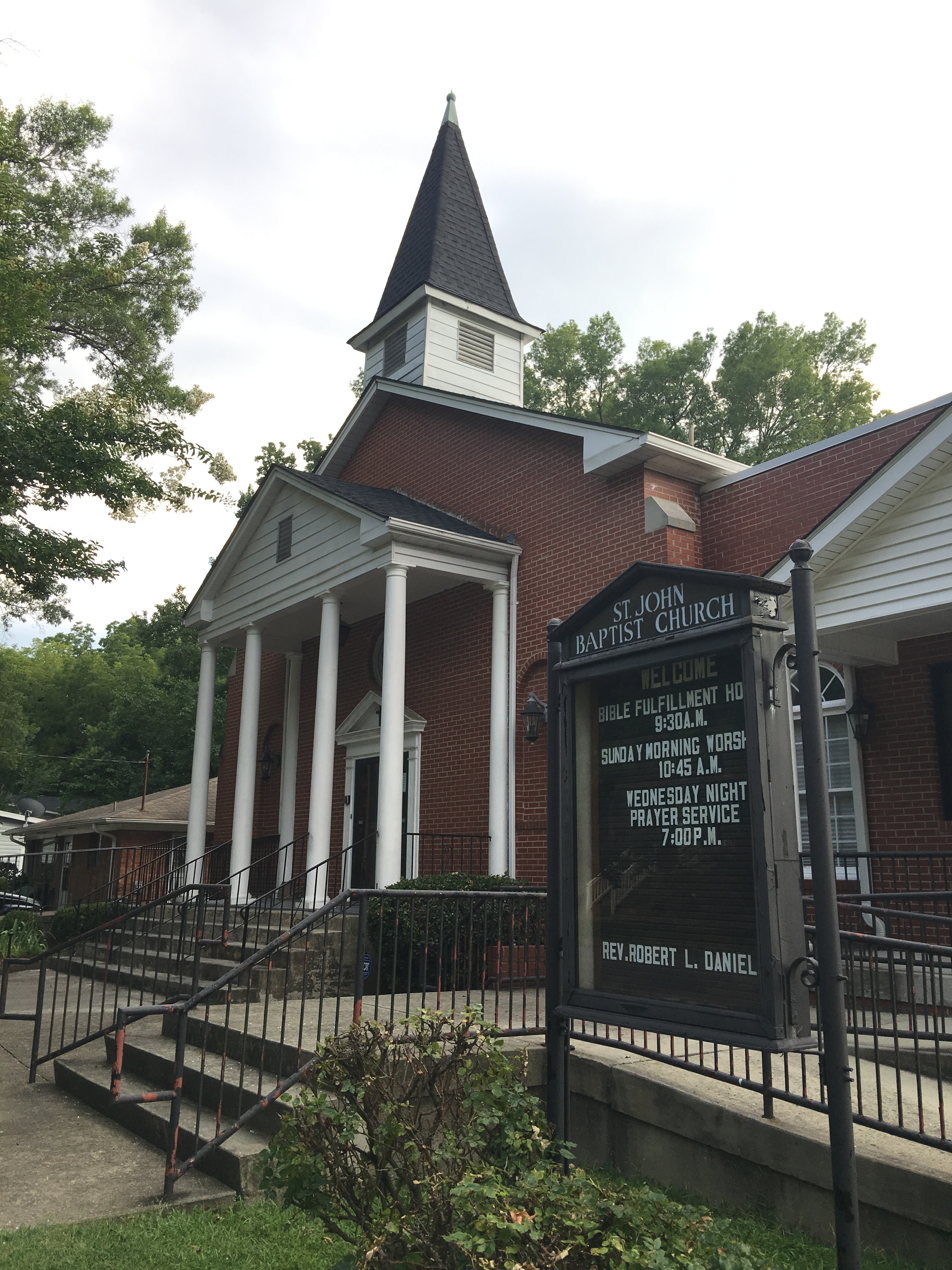
St. John Missionary Baptist Church on Onslow Street.

In the 21st century Walltown has faced periods of gentrification, due to its close proximity to Downtown Durham and Duke University. Historically a blue-collar neighborhood, the nearby neighborhoods Watts-Hillandale and Trinity Park are historically white and affluent. In 2006 the crime rate in Walltown reduced to half the percentage rate it had in 1996.Self-Help Corporation's efforts in the 1990s led to the brokering of affordable rental housing for Duke employees and students and the creation of Trinity Heights Homesites and the renovation of Walltown Elementary School. In 2018 leaders of the Walltown Community Association met with Durham City Council officials to propose city regulations and zoning standards to help reduce property tax increases and raised rent in the neighborhood, which has forced some residents to relocate.

In October 2000 Joseph and Cynthia Henderson opened Walltown Children's Theatre, a dance and performing arts school, in a former church building in Walltown. Durham Parks and Recreation offered grants to fund the tuition at the theatre for ten students from low-income households.

In 2005 the Walltown Health Clinic opened.

In March 2009 the Walltown Community Recreational Center was built, a city-funded community center adjacent to Walltown Park, replacing an original recreational center that was built during segregation. Bull City Legacy, a minor league professional basketball team in the Tobacco Road Basketball League, played their home games at the center.

== Notable residents ==
- DJ Nabs, American DJ and record producer
- Jonathan Wilson-Hartgrove, American Christian preacher and writer

== Notable buildings ==
- George Wall House
