= Northgate Mall (North Carolina) =

Northgate Mall (1960-2020)
- Location: Durham, North Carolina, United States
- Coordinates: 36°1′12″N 78°54′36″W
- Address: 1058 West Club Boulevard
- Opened: 1960, enclosed 1974
- Closed: May 4, 2020
- Developer: W. Kenan Rand
- Manager: Northwood Investors
- Owner: Northwood Investors
- Num. of stores: ≈30
- Num. of anchor tenants: 2 (both vacant)
- Floor area: 900,000 sqft
- Floors: 1 (2 in anchors)
- Parking: 5,000+ spaces
- Website: northgatemall.com

Northgate Mall was a regional shopping mall located off Interstate 85 and Gregson Street (exit 176) in northern Durham, North Carolina, United States. The mall was in close proximity to Duke University and downtown Durham, between the Trinity Park and Walltown neighborhoods.

Venetian Carousel at Northgate Mall

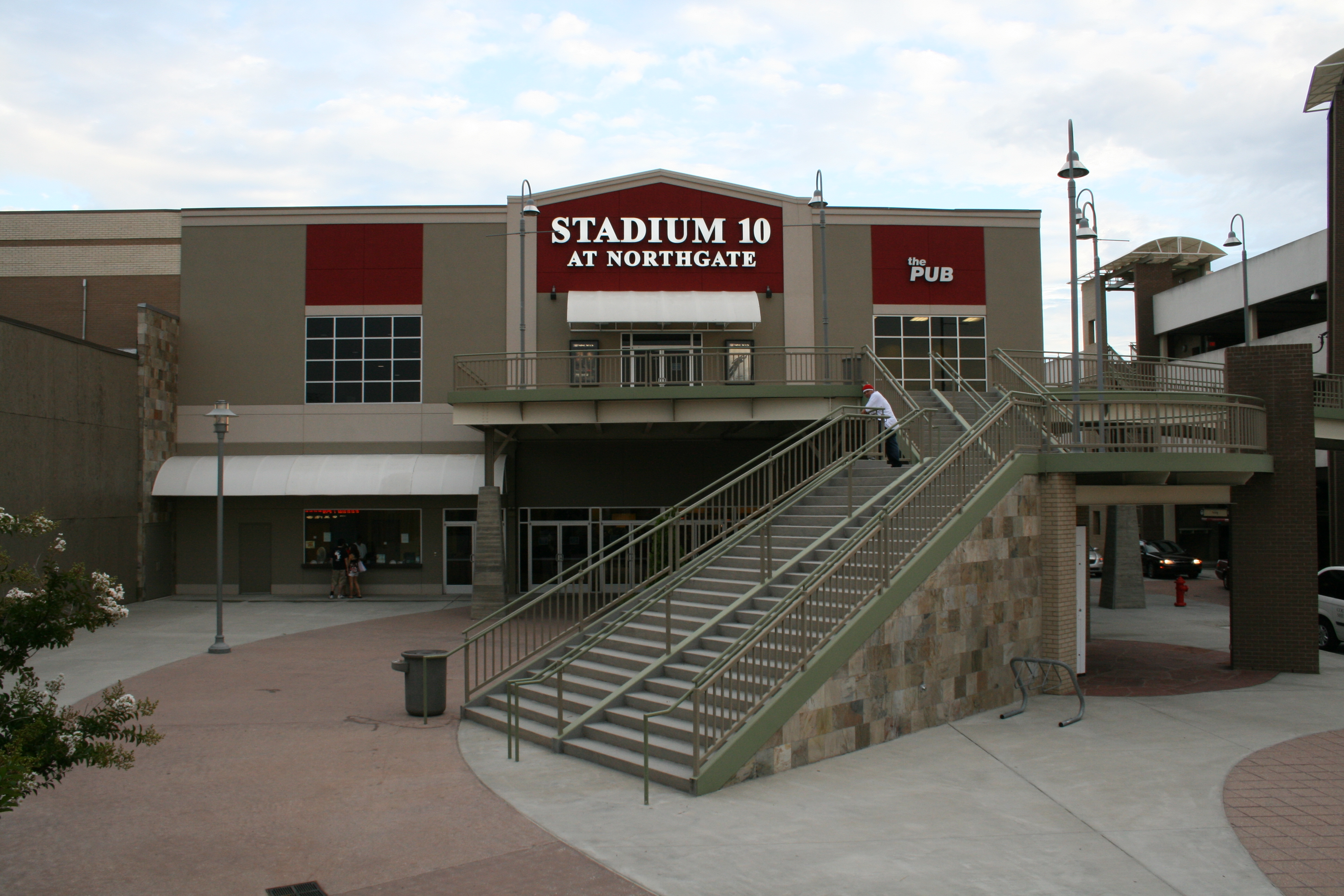
Stadium 10 cinema at Northgate Mall.

== History ==
=== Early years ===
Northgate opened in 1960 as a traditional open air strip shopping center developed by W. Kenan Rand. The original center ran perpendicular to W. Club Blvd. Original tenants included Colonial Stores, Roses, Kerr Drug and eventually a cinema opened in 1962. In 1973, facing increased competition from other enclosed shopping centers, developers decided to add a Sears and Thalhimers department store and built an indoor enclosure connecting the two stores.

Northgate Mall first expanded in 1986, when Thalhimers relocated to a newer store at the east end of the mall, along with additional shop shape. The following year, a portion of the original shopping center was torn down and a food court was later added. Big Star (later Harris Teeter) relocated to a newly built strip-style plaza, called "The Shops at Northgate", which also included a few locally owned businesses previously located in the original strip center. Kerr Drug relocated next to Sears, while Roses remained until closing in 1992. Hecht's relocated to the south end of the mall 1994 on the site formerly occupied by Roses. The former Thalhimer's store became Hudson Belk later that same year. Towards the end of the 20th century, educational assessment company Measurement Incorporated was based in the basement of the mall, but soon moved out to its own office space.

=== Mall In Transition ===
In the 2000s, the tenant mix of the mall began shifting from national chains to more mom-and-pop stores due to the opening of The Streets at Southpoint. The demise of South Square Mall helped Northgate for a time since the competition was further away and didn't have too much direct impact on business. More changes were in store when Belk left the mall in 2005 and was replaced by a Phoenix Theaters cineplex (now Northgate Stadium 10), while its wing was renovated into an outdoor plaza. Also that year in the Shops at Northgate, the Harris Teeter closed, with its space converting into a C&H Cafeteria, a regional cafeteria chain, and a Guitar Center. Office Depot moved into the space spot OfficeMax previously occupied that year as well, which is now occupied by Sky Zone.

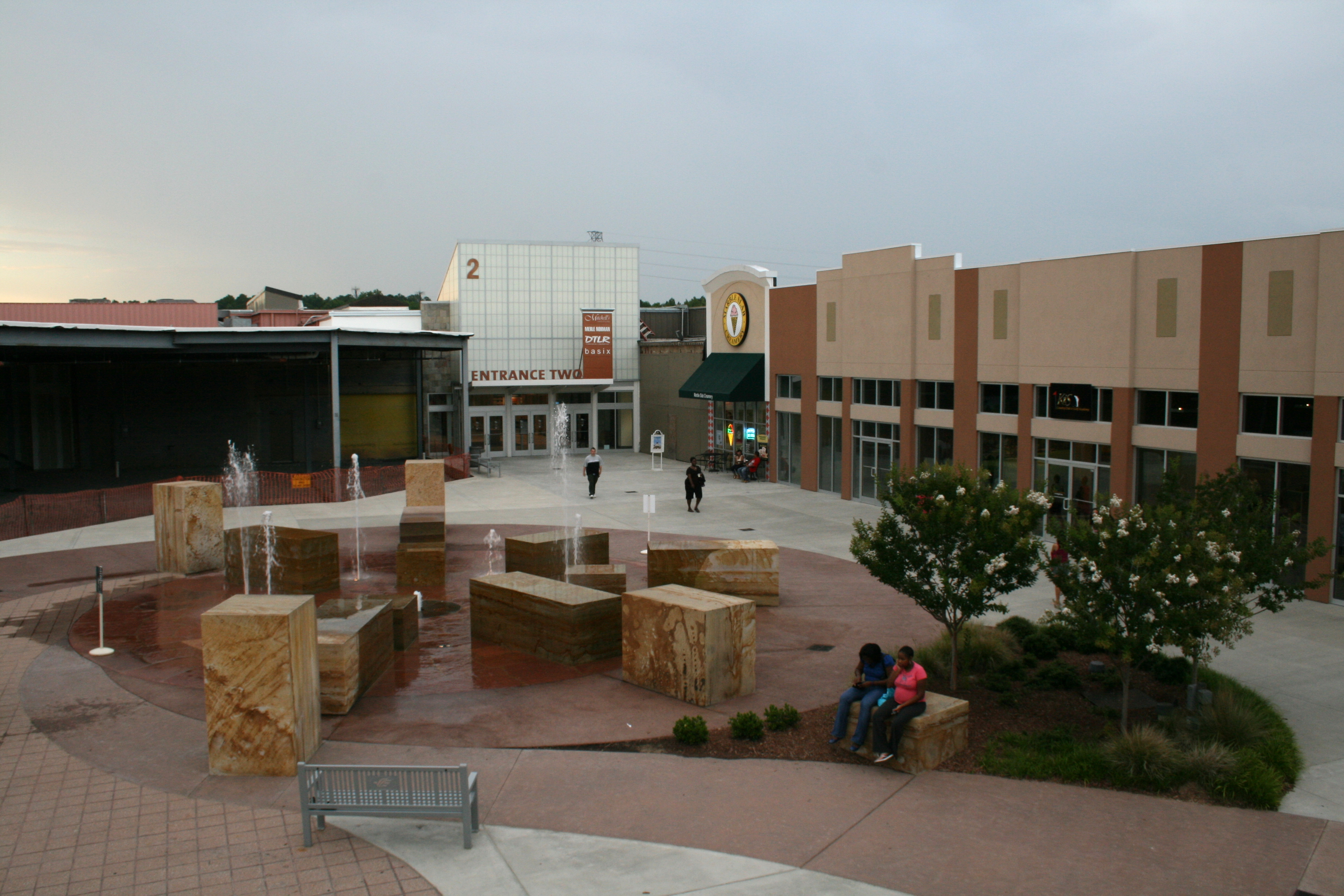
Plaza Entrance to Mall

However, crime at the mall remained an issue. Local news reports say that the mall had five violent incidents during the late 2000s, including a fatal stabbing in 2007, many of these provoked by fights and teen violence.

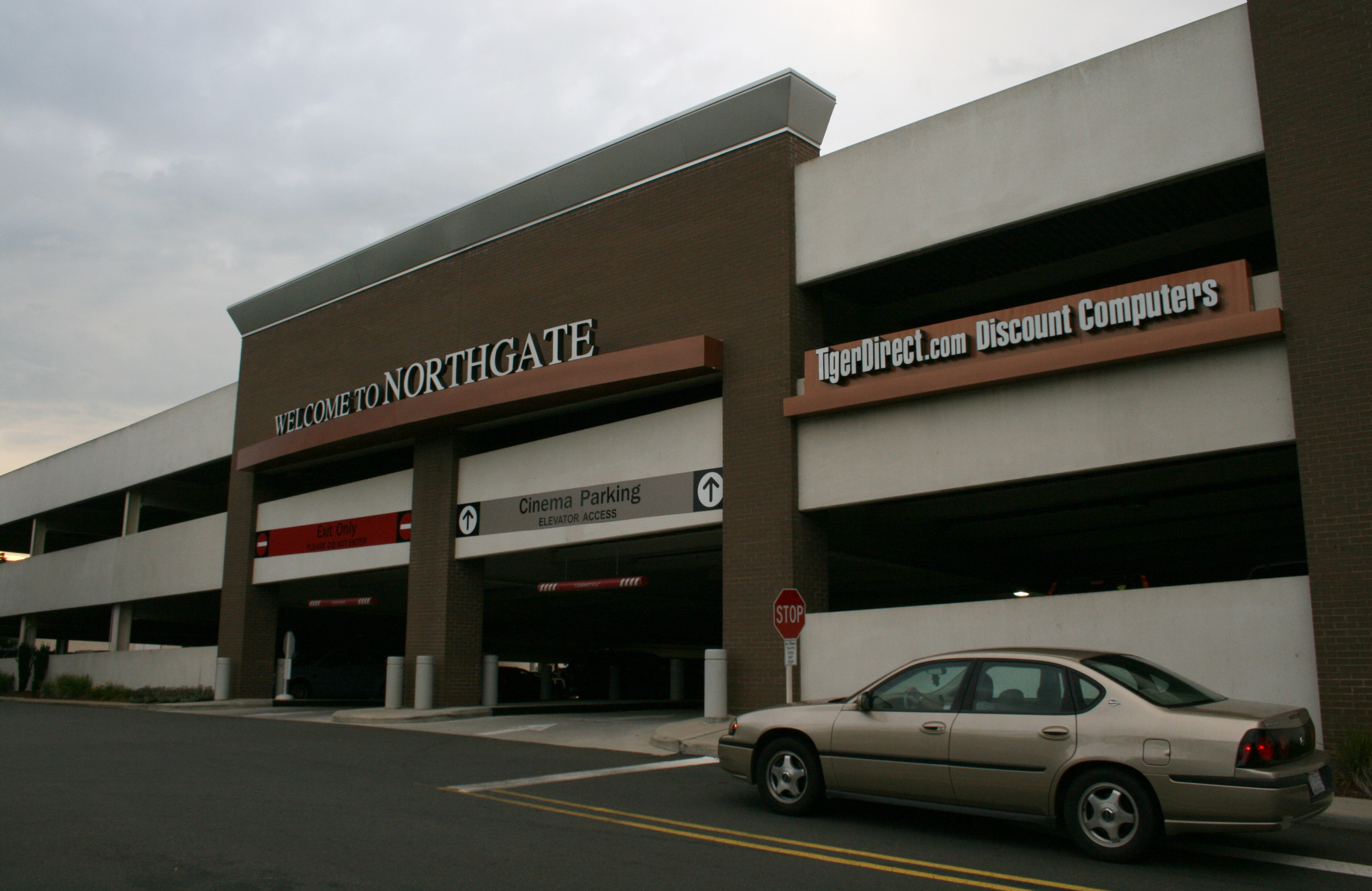
Northgate Mall's parking deck.

=== Changes In Retail Landscape ===
On January 4, 2017, Macy's announced it was closing its Northgate location following a disappointing holiday shopping season. The closure was part of a company-wide effort to improve profitability and reduce its brick-and-mortar footprint. Following the announcement, mall officials began working on a new master plan to transform Northgate from primarily retail space to accommodate multiple uses, including office space, fitness, entertainment, and seasonal operations. The former Macy's space was sold to Duke Health in December 2017 to house administrative offices and additional medical clinics.

In June 2018, Sears sold its Northgate store to Northwood Investors, a real estate investment firm based in Colorado. A lease back agreement was signed to keep Sears in business for the time being, which included the main store and a Sears Auto Center nearby. In addition, Northwood also collected two large promissory notes owned by Northgate Associates valued for a total of $62 million. In October of that year, Northwood moved toward foreclosure proceedings against the mall's owners. On December 14, Northgate Associates sold the mall to Northwood for $34.5 million, in an attempt to avoid foreclosure. This arrangement allowed the mall to continue to operate.

On December 28, 2018, it was announced that Sears would be closing as part of a plan to close 80 stores nationwide. The store shut down in March 2019. The former Sears store served as a large statewide hurricane shelter during Hurricane Dorian in September 2019.

=== Closure ===
On May 4, 2020, it was announced that the Northgate Mall would be closing permanently, citing the impact of the COVID-19 pandemic as a primary reason. There are pending plans to demolish the old mall. From August 23-25, 2024, a "Thunderdome 5" Airsoft event was held inside the mall.

== Anchors ==
- Northgate Stadium 10 - Opened as Thalhimers in 1986, became Hecht's in 1992, became Hudson Belk in 1995. Hudson Belk closed in 2003 and converted into a movie theater in 2005. The theater closed permanently on August 1, 2023.
- Macy's - Opened in 1994 was Hecht's, became Macy's in 2006, closed in 2017. 185,090 sq ft (17,195 m^{2})
- Sears - Opened in 1974, closed in 2019. 175,428 sq ft (16,297.8 m^{2}).
