= New Hill =

New Hill may refer to:

- New Hill, West Virginia, an unincorporated community in Monongalia County, West Virginia, United States
- New Hill, North Carolina, an unincorporated community in Wake County, North Carolina, United States
- New Hill, Alberta, a settlement in Red Deer County, Alberta, Canada

== See also ==
- New Hill Historic District, a historic district located at New Hill, North Carolina
- New Chapel Hill, Texas, a city in Smith County, Texas, United States
