= New Hope Valley Railway =

Heritage railroad in Bonsal, North Carolina

Coordinates: 35.6599°N 78.9755°W

- Triangle's Train
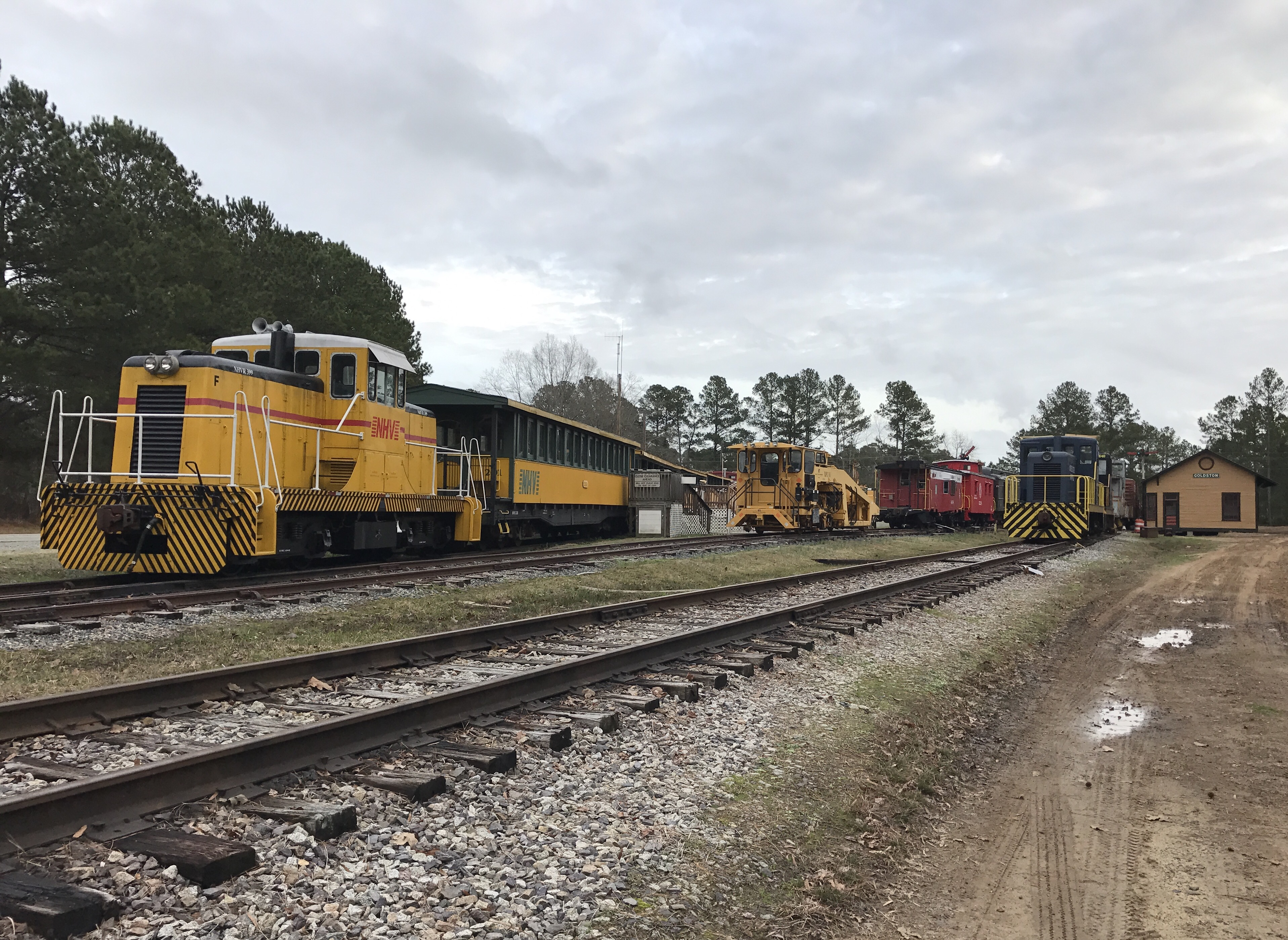
- New Hope Valley Railroad museum train cars and locomotives

Overview
- Headquarters: Bonsal, North Carolina
- Reporting mark: NCRM
- Locale: New Hill, North Carolina
- Dates of operation: 1982–present

Technical
- Track gauge: 4 ft 8 1/2 in (1,435 mm) standard gauge
- Length: 4 miles (6.4 km)

Other
- Website: www.triangletrain.com

The New Hope Valley Railway (reporting mark NHVX), also known as the Triangle's Train, is a heritage railroad in Bonsal, North Carolina operated by the North Carolina Railway Museum, Inc., an all-volunteer, nonprofit, and tax exempt educational and historical organization.

The railroad consists of a total of four miles of track between the communities of Bonsal, North Carolina and New Hill, North Carolina.

The North Carolina Railway Museum, located in Bonsal, North Carolina, features a collection of antique train cars, artifacts and historic train memorabilia, and a G-scale model railroad layout and club.

== History ==
The railroad line was originally chartered to be the New Hope Valley Railroad in 1904. It was subsequently merged into the Durham & South Carolina Railroad in 1905 after the NHVRR had acquired land to build the line from Bonsal to West End (now known as Carrborro), but before any track had been built. The line was constructed as the Durham & South Carolina Railroad (D&SC) in 1905-1906 to tap the timber resources of the valley of New Hope Creek, and served the communities of Bonsal (where it had a junction with the Seaboard Air Line Railroad, now part of CSX), Beaver Creek, Seaforth, Farrington, Blands, Penny, and Durham. In Durham it was the sole railroad with access to the American Tobacco Company for transporting tobacco products in an out of the plant. American Tobacco Company investors were also investors in the "old" Norfolk and Southern Railroad between Norfolk, Virginia and Charlotte.

The line was extended south from Bonsal, North Carolina between 1911 and 1913 to Duncan, North Carolina where it joined the "old" Norfolk Southern Railroad. The D&SC line was leased by the Norfolk Southern Railroad in 1920 to provide the larger railroad with access to Durham. In 1925 a spur was built at Durham to serve the new plant of the American Tobacco Company in that city. The NCRM was founded in 1963 in East Carolina University in Greenville, North Carolina; in 1964, it was later chartered as the East Carolina Chapter of the National Railway Historical Society, Inc. The line was rebuilt on a new alignment in the 1970s by the US Army Corps of Engineers when the B. Everett Jordan Dam was constructed, impounding the valley of New Hope Creek to form Jordan Lake. The line eventually became (briefly) part of the Southern Railway, and a 6-mile section was sold to the East Carolina Chapter, NRHS in 1982 were a group of individuals formed the New Hope Valley Railway. This organization was subsequently renamed the North Carolina Railway Museum, Inc. early in 2008.

The northern portion of the original railroad, from the community of New Hill north to Durham has been converted into the American Tobacco Trail. To the south, the railroad is part of the Shearon Harris Nuclear Power Plant and its surrounding land.

== Excursion trains ==
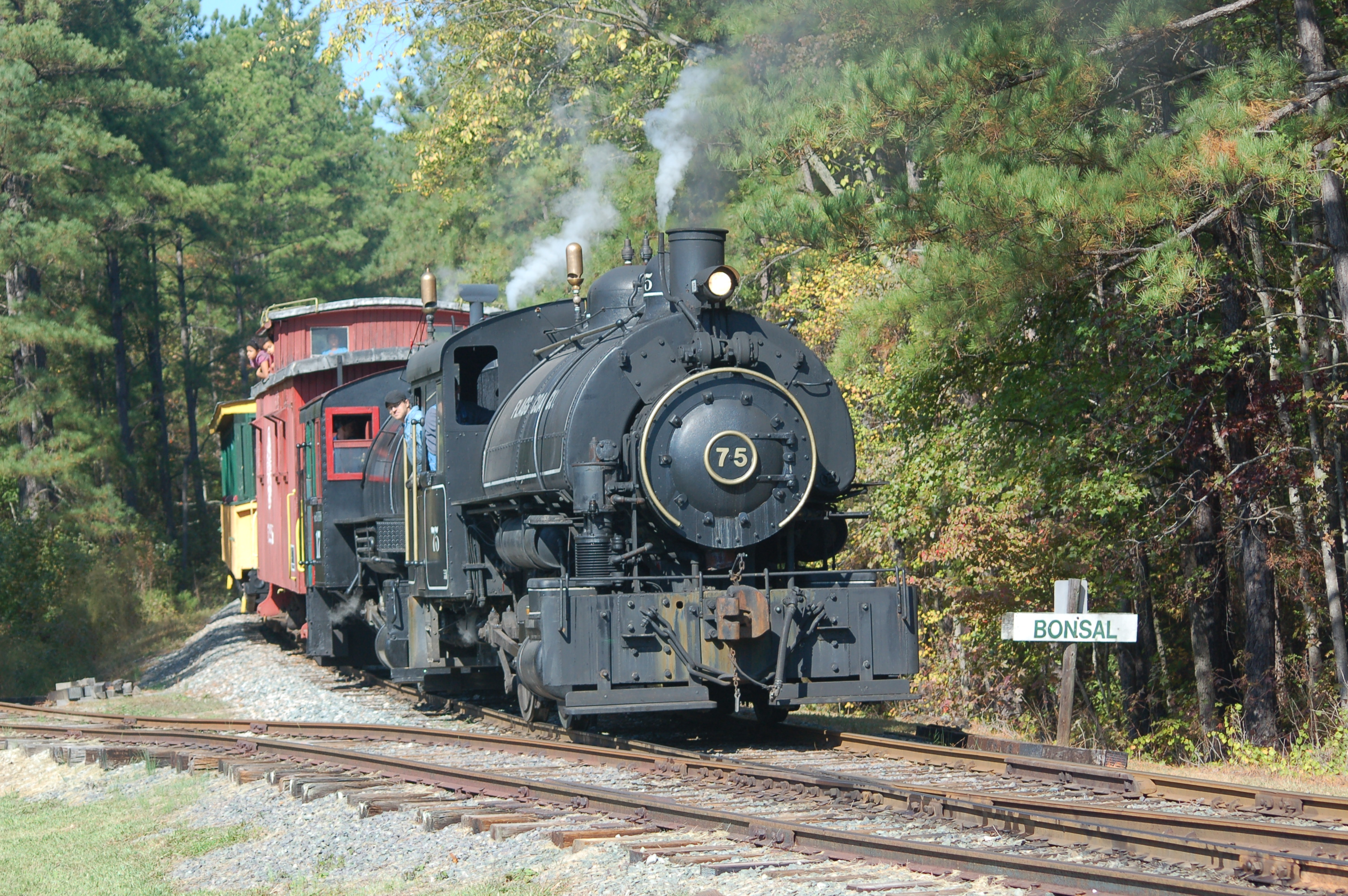
The New Hope Valley Railway excursion train returns to Bonsal led by a double-header of the visiting Flagg Coal Co. #75 and NHVRY's own #17 steam engines.

The railroad operates passenger excursion trains each month from March to December. Special trains are operated for Halloween and Christmas. They have many other themed train excursions throughout the year.

== Operate-a-Loco ==
The New Hope Valley Railway offers various activities for the public. One of them is their Operate-a-Loco program. On select Saturdays and Sundays, anybody who wishes to (must be over age 18 and have a valid drivers license) may come and drive one of their diesel locomotives. You are guided along their 4 miles of track (8 mile round trip) under the supervision of one of their trained engineers. All equipment and other items are provided by the railway.

== Organization ==
The railroad is operated by an all-volunteer crew by the North Carolina Railway Museum formerly known, up to 2008, as the East Carolina Chapter of the National Railway Historical Society, it is also a member of the HeritageRail Alliance.

== Equipment ==
=== Locomotives ===
Locomotive details
No.	Image	Type	Model	Built	Builder	Status
110		Steam	2-6-2	1927	Vulcan Iron Works	Under restoration
17		Steam	0-4-0	1941	Vulcan Iron Works	Undergoing 1,472-day inspection and overhaul
1686		Diesel	80-ton switcher	1953	General Electric	Operational
399		Diesel	65-ton switcher	1943	General Electric	Operational
70		Diesel	45-ton switcher	1941	Geo D. Whitcomb Company	Inoperable
10		Diesel	25-ton switcher	1950	General Electric	Inoperable
75		Diesel	80-ton switcher	1947	Baldwin-Lima-Hamilton	Inoperable
5		Diesel	S-1 switcher	1945	American Locomotive Company	Inoperable

=== Rolling stock ===
Rolling stock details
No.	Image	Type	Built	Builder	Status
308		Caboose	—N/a	—N/a	Operational
328		Caboose	1949	—N/a	Operational
302		Caboose	—N/a	—N/a	Operational
309		Caboose	—N/a	—N/a	Operational
5228		Caboose	1926	—N/a	Operational
6929		Passenger car	1958	Budd Company	Under restoration
—N/a	—N/a	Tank car	—N/a	—N/a	Static; used as signage at end of line in New Hill
