= Harris Lake (New Hill, North Carolina) =

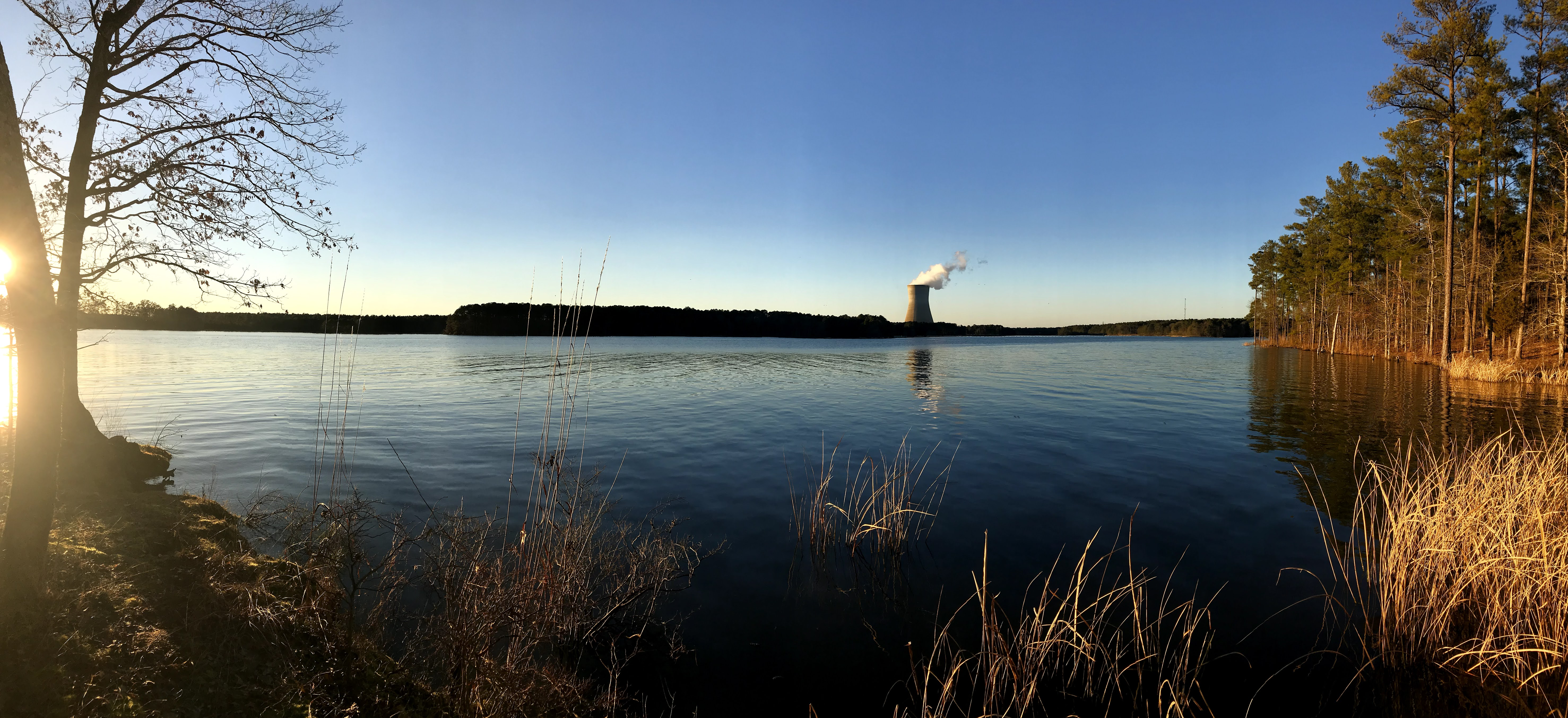
- The sun setting over Harris Lake with the nuclear power plant in view (2021)

- Location within North Carolina Location within the United States
- Location: Chatham / Wake counties, North Carolina, United States
- Coordinates: 35°37′24.852″N 78°55′2.22″W
- Lake type: Reservoir
- Primary inflows: Buckhorn Creek, Cary Branch
- Primary outflows: Buckhorn Creek
- Basin countries: United States
- Surface area: 4,100 acres (1,700 ha)
- Surface elevation: 220 ft (67 m)

Harris Lake, or Shearon Harris Reservoir, is a reservoir in New Hill, North Carolina, approximately 20 miles southwest of Raleigh, the state capitol. Lying 220 ft (67 m) above sea level, the lake covers 4,100 acres (17 km^{2}) in southwestern Wake County and southeastern Chatham County. It is the source and outlet of cooling water for the Shearon Harris nuclear power plant. The lake is approximately 2.5 miles from B. Everett Jordan Lake. It was created by impounding Buckhorn Creek. There are two public boat ramps; one is near the southern end off North Carolina Highway 42, and the other near the northern end by Avent Ferry Road.

Harris Lake County Park is located on the northeastern section of the lake. The park was leased to Wake County by Duke Energy in 1985, and opened to the public in 1999. The 680-acre park features five miles of hiking trails, almost eight miles of bike trails, and other amenities including picnic areas, a fishing pier, and a disc golf course. The park is home to several historic sites from an agricultural community, including the remains of the Womble, Smith, and Holleman households. The park also protects valuable Longleaf Pine forests.
