= William D. Johnson (CEO) =

American attorney and businessman (born 1954)

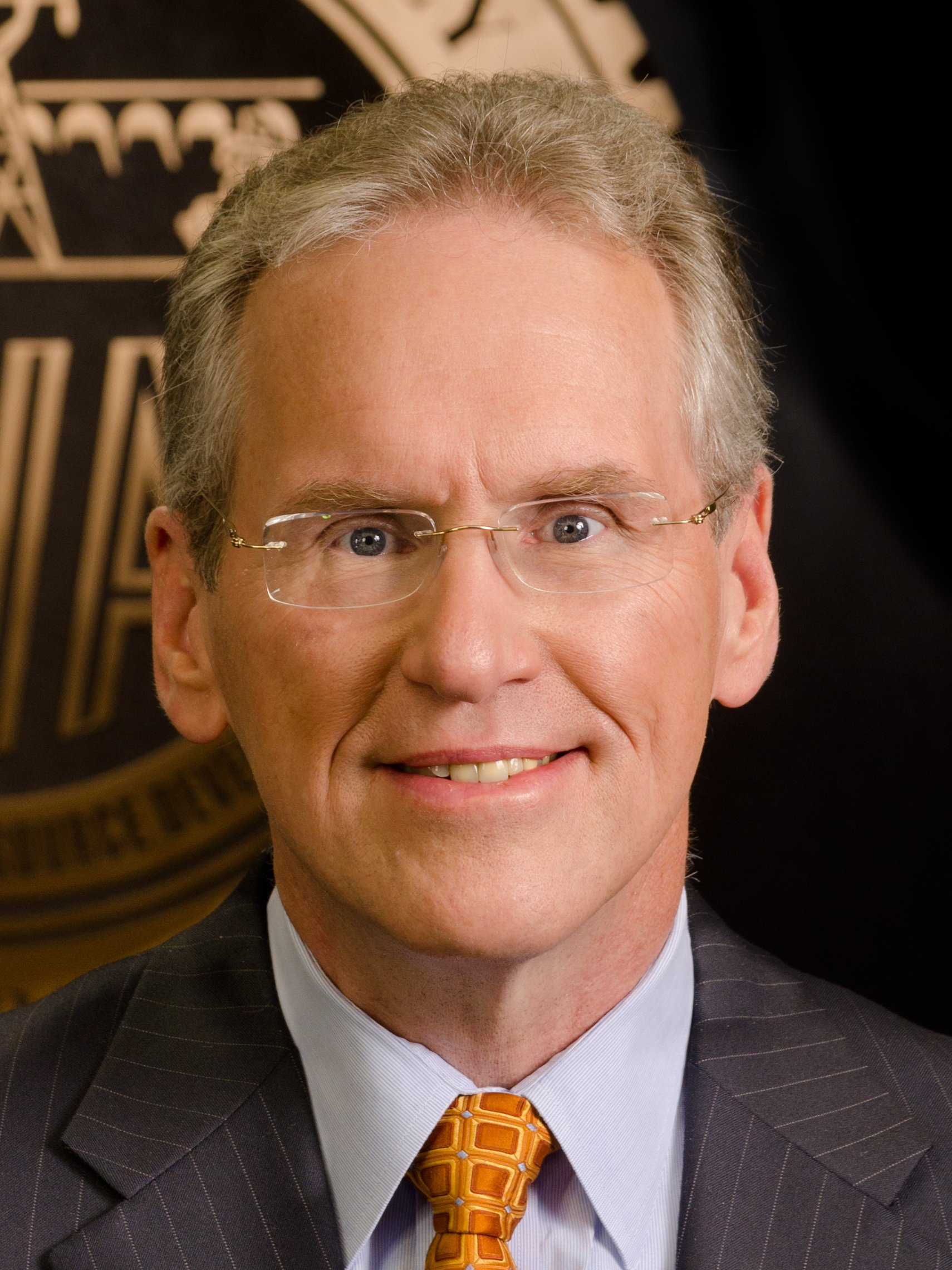
- Born: William Dean Johnson; January 9, 1954 (age 72)
- Education: Duke University (BA); University of North Carolina at Chapel Hill (JD)
- Known for: President and CEO, PG&E; President and CEO of TVA; Chairman and CEO of Progress Energy

William Dean "Bill" Johnson (born January 9, 1954) is an American attorney and businessman. He is a retired president and CEO of the Pacific Gas and Electric Company, as of June 2020.

== Early life ==
Bill Johnson was born on January 9, 1954. He played football, basketball and track at Kane Area High School in Kane, Pennsylvania and was class president three years at Kane Area High School in Kane, Pennsylvania. He was a pre-med student at Pennsylvania State University and was a backup center for the Penn State Nittany Lions football team in 1972 and 1973. He did not earn a degree from Penn State, but later graduated from Duke University summa cum laude with a bachelor's degree in history and obtained a J.D. degree from the University of North Carolina at Chapel Hill in 1982.

== Career ==
After graduating, he served as a law clerk on the U.S. Court of Appeals for the Fourth Circuit. He later worked as a partner in the Raleigh, North Carolina office of Hunton & Williams.

He joined Progress Energy forerunner Carolina Power & Light in 1995. He became president of Progress Energy in 2005, and chairman and CEO in 2007. He remained the chairman, president, and CEO of Progress Energy until the company was bought by Duke Energy, in 2012.

Per the merger agreement between Progress and Duke, he was slated to become CEO of the new combined company. Within an hour after the merger closed, he was removed as CEO by the new board, the majority of whom were legacy Duke Energy board members. The Los Angeles Times estimated that Johnson received $44 million as severance pay.

He next served the Tennessee Valley Authority (TVA) for six years before announcing plans to retire, in November 2018, amid some controversy. At their February 2019 meeting, the TVA board of directors announced their selection of Jeffrey Lyash to replace Johnson, effective April 2019. Lyash came to TVA from Ontario Power Generation Inc. (OPG).

On April 3, 2019, Johnson was announced as the new president and CEO of PG&E Corporation, replacing interim CEO John Simon, and garnering "more than twice the base salary" of his predecessor, Geisha Williams.

On April 22, 2020, it was publicly announced that Johnson would be retiring from PG&E.

On June 16, 2020, PG&E pled guilty in court to 84 felony counts of involuntary manslaughter, as PG&E's equipment was the cause of the 2018 Camp Fire in California. No individual PG&E management person or other employee was held criminally liable. Johnson was hired subsequent to the fire and led the effort to resolve issues which the fire had created.
