= Dukeville, North Carolina =

Populated place in North Carolina, US

Coordinates: 35.7106°N 80.3761°W

Dukeville is a populated place in Rowan County, North Carolina, United States.

It was built as a mill village along the banks of the Yadkin River in 1926 to house plant employees of the Buck Steam Station, owned by Duke Energy.

In 2014, residents living near the Buck Steam Station in Dukeville were told that "coal ash pits near their homes could be leaching dangerous materials into groundwater." The issue became a documentary film for the 2017 Tribeca Film Festival.
