= Buck Steam Station =

Duke Energy power plant

- Country: United States of America
- Location: Salisbury Township, Rowan County, near Salisbury, North Carolina
- Coordinates: 35°42′43″N 80°22′37″W
- Commission date: 1926
- Owner: Duke Energy

Thermal power station
- Primary fuel: Coal, Natural Gas
- Turbine technology: Steam, gas turbine
- Cooling source: Yadkin River
- Combined cycle?: Planned

Power generation
- Units operational: 4
- Units planned: 2
- Nameplate capacity: 369 MW, 620 MW planned

The Buck Steam Station is a 369-MW formerly coal-fired electrical power plant, owned by Duke Energy. There are also three natural gas-fueled combustion turbines at the location that provide an additional 93 MW (and which began operation in 1970), and two natural gas-fueled combined cycle turbines are planned for the near future. Remaining coal-fired units (IDs 5-9) were decommissioned in mid-2011 and April 2013, with only natural gas units (11C and 12C) remaining.

== History ==
=== Steam plant ===
The Buck Steam Station was built in 1926. It is named after a co-founder of Duke Energy, James Buchanan "Buck" Duke. The plant was originally three units, but a fourth was added when the company bought up an order cancelled by the Pentagon.

Dukeville, North Carolina was built as a mill village along the banks of the Yadkin River in 1926 to house plant employees of the Buck Steam Station. In 2014, Dukeville residents were told that "coal ash pits near their homes could be leaching dangerous materials into groundwater."

=== Addition of combined cycle turbines ===
In 2007, Duke Energy began to pursue permission to add two new combined cycle, natural gas-fired, 620 MW generating units to its fleet: one at the Dan River Steam Station in Rockingham County, the other at the Buck Steam Station. This was done in order to diversify the company's fuel sources, expand its generating capacity, and to modernize its energy generation by moving away from less efficient, more polluting coal. When the two turbines were added, two of the four older coal units were to go offline.

=== Demolition ===
Part of the plant was imploded in August 2018, and another section came down October 19, 2018. The decommissioning was the subject of an episode of the Smithsonian Channel's "Inside Mighty Machines".

== See also ==
- List of power stations
