= Progress Energy =

Former energy company in North Carolina, South Carolina, and Florida

Progress Energy Inc.

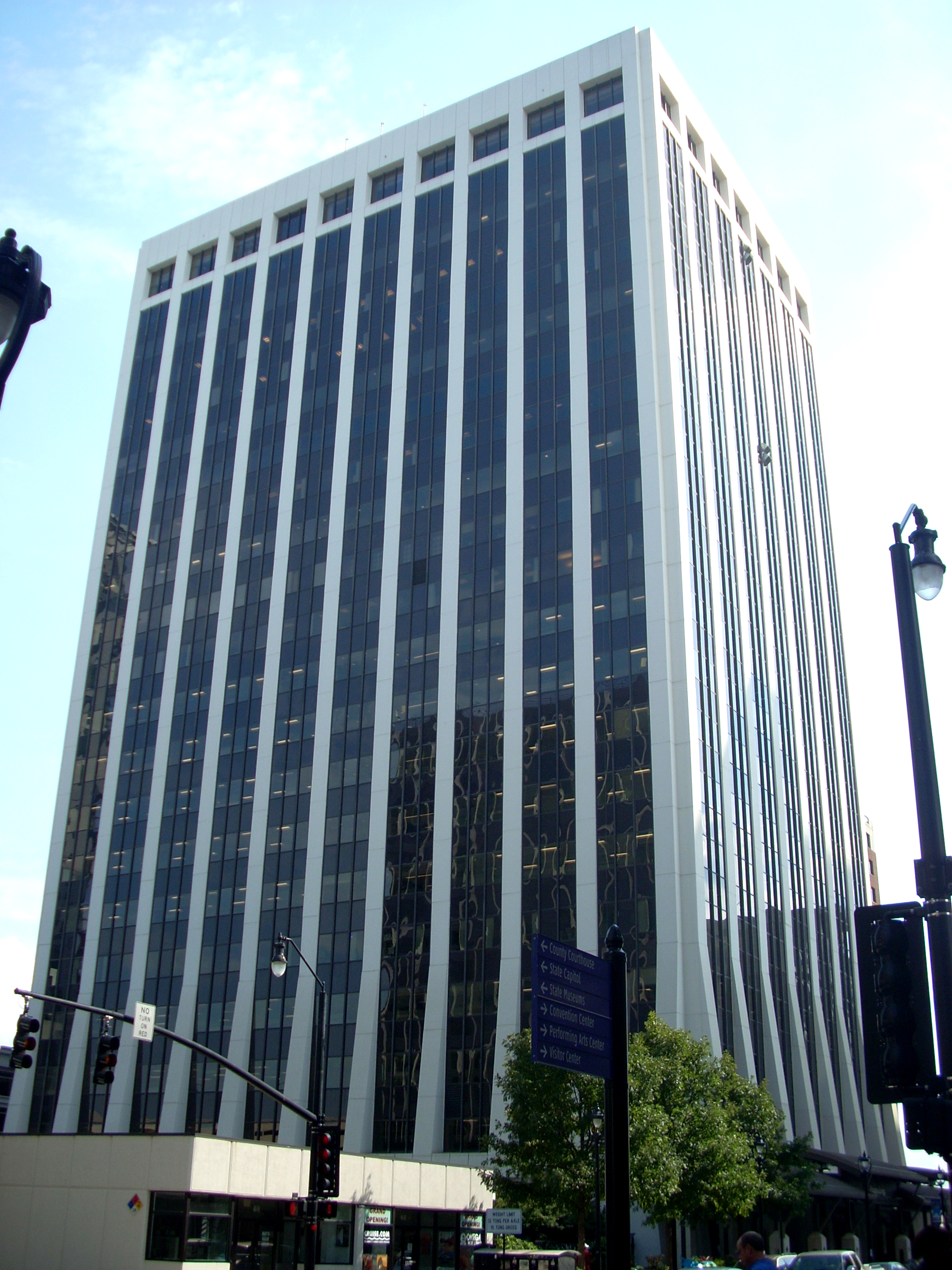
- One Progress Plaza, Progress Energy's former headquarters in Raleigh, North Carolina
- Type: Public
- Traded as: NYSE: PGN
- Industry: Electric utilities
- Founded: 1908 (as Carolina Power & Light)
- Defunct: 2012
- Fate: Merged into Duke Energy
- Headquarters: One Progress Plaza; 411 Fayetteville Street, Raleigh, North Carolina, United States
- Area served: North Carolina: Cape Fear, Far West, Research Triangle, Sandhills; South Carolina: Pee Dee; Florida: Big Bend, Central Florida, North Central Florida, Tampa Bay
- Number of employees: 11,000 (2007)

Progress Energy was a power generation and distribution company. Headquartered in Raleigh, North Carolina, Progress Energy served approximately 3.1 million customers in the Carolinas and Florida, with a total service area of 54,000 square miles (140,000 km^{2}). It was a Fortune 500 company with more than 21,000 megawatts of generation capacity and $9 billion in annual revenues. The company was acquired by Duke Energy in 2012.

Progress Energy was the majority owner and operator of 32 power plants, including the Brunswick, Crystal River, Robinson, and Shearon Harris nuclear power plants.

== History ==
=== Predecessors ===
Raleigh-based Carolina Power & Light was founded in 1908 through the merger of Raleigh Electric, Central Carolina Power, and Consumer Light & Power. It acquired the Asheville Power and Light company the following year. By 1999, the company served as the primary power provider for eastern North Carolina, northeastern South Carolina, and the Asheville area, with 1.2 million customers. It was the second-largest power company in North Carolina.

St. Petersburg-based Florida Power was founded in 1899 and began to expand starting in the 1920s. By 1999, the company served as the primary power provider for Central Florida and North Central Florida, with 1.3 million customers. In 1982, the company was reorganized into the Florida Progress Corporation to diversify beyond electricity, with its non-electric holdings including the broadband infrastructure provider Progress Telecom and a $5 million stake in the Tampa Bay Devil Rays.

=== Merger ===
On August 24, 1999, Carolina Power & Light announced that it would acquire Florida Progress Corporation for $5.3 billion in cash and stock, as well as $2.7 billion in assumed debt. The company would be the ninth-largest electric utility in the country, with a total generation capacity of 18,520 megawatts. The merger was completed in the fall of 2000, with the combined company retaining CP&L management.

The combined company took on the name Progress Energy, though both the CP&L and Florida Power names were retained at the consumer service level until a rebranding effort in 2003. The rebrand was partially to prevent confusion between Florida Power and the unrelated Florida Power & Light.

In 2004, the company expanded its downtown Raleigh headquarters with the construction of Two Progress Plaza.

=== Sale to Duke Energy ===
On January 10, 2011, Duke Energy announced plans to take over Progress Energy in a $26 billion deal resulting in the country's largest electric utility with 7.1 million customers. Duke Energy plans to "maintain substantial operations in Raleigh." When the merger was completed on July 3, 2012, Duke Chairman James E. (Jim) Rogers became chairman and CEO of the new combined company, while Progress CEO William D. Johnson resigned.

== Environmental record ==
In 2008, the Corporate Responsibility Officer named Progress Energy to its list of 100 Best Corporate Citizens. Progress Energy was named to the Dow Jones Sustainability Index in 2009, 2008, 2007, 2006 and 2005.

The company is investing $300,000 in a UNC Chapel Hill study to map the offshore wind power potential of North Carolina. Progress Energy launched its SunSense-branded solar incentive programs in 2009.

Progress Energy has installed flue-gas desulfurization technology, or scrubbers, to remove sulfur dioxide emissions from its nine largest coal-fired power plant units.

Researchers at the University of Massachusetts Amherst identified Progress Energy as the 29th-largest corporate producer of Air pollution in the United States in 2002, when it released roughly 39 million pounds of toxic chemicals into the air. Major pollutants included nickel compounds, chromium compounds, sulfuric acid, and hydrochloric acid. Progress has also been named a potentially responsible party at the Carolina Transformer Co. Superfund toxic waste site, according to the Center for Public Integrity.

== Naming rights ==
Progress Energy owned the naming rights to the University of Central Florida's Progress Energy Welcome Center, St. Petersburg's Progress Energy Park, home of Al Lang Field, Progress Energy Center for the Arts-Mahaffey Theater, and the "Progress Energy Center for the Performing Arts" in downtown Raleigh, NC.

== See also ==
- List of power stations in Florida
