= Davidson County Solar Farm =

Solar power station in North Carolina, US

- Country: United States
- Location: Davidson County
- Coordinates: 35°44′57″N 80°17′37″W
- Status: Operational
- Commission date: December 2010

Solar farm
- Type: Flat-panel PV
- Site area: 200 acres

Power generation
- Units operational: 63,000
- Nameplate capacity: 17.2 MW

The Davidson County Solar Farm is a 17.2 megawatt solar power station located in the heart of North Carolina, near the community of Linwood. SunEdison built the array of photovoltaic panels, and Duke Energy buys all the output from the solar farm. The solar farm is located on North Carolina Highway 47, off New Jersey Church Road.

== Economics ==
In mid-May 2008, the Davidson County Board of Commissioners agreed to subsidize the project. This included $1.8 million to go into land grading and multiple cash payments beginning in July 2009, and going through 2011. Another $127 million was raised from investors. The solar farm created 80 jobs during construction, and three jobs in order to maintain the power facility. In addition, SunEdison will receive an annual refund of certain taxes pertaining to their various constructions due to modified legislation to include solar energy projects. SunEdison had been looking at an almost ten times larger 2,400-acre (970 ha) piece of land off of Interstate 85 near Lexington, but the owner declined to sell the property. However the company had already spent $134,000 researching to see if that site would work.

== Efficiency ==
One of the driving forces behind the construction of this solar farm, and SunEdison's presence in North Carolina altogether, is due to a state law passed in 2007 that requires public utilities such as Duke Energy to obtain a minimum of 12.5% of their power from renewable energy by 2021. The farm has a rating of 21.5 megawatts, which translates to 18 megawatts of peak AC power. Every year that the solar farm is in use, it will offset 32 million pounds of carbon dioxide. SunEdison claims that once complete, the power plant will generate enough energy to power more than 2,600 homes. The site uses GPS software to track the sun.

== See also ==
- Solar power
- Photovoltaics
- Solar power in the United States
- List of photovoltaic power stations
- Renewable energy commercialization
