= Bonsal, North Carolina =

Unincorporated community in North Carolina, US

Coordinates: 35°39′38″N 78°58′25″W

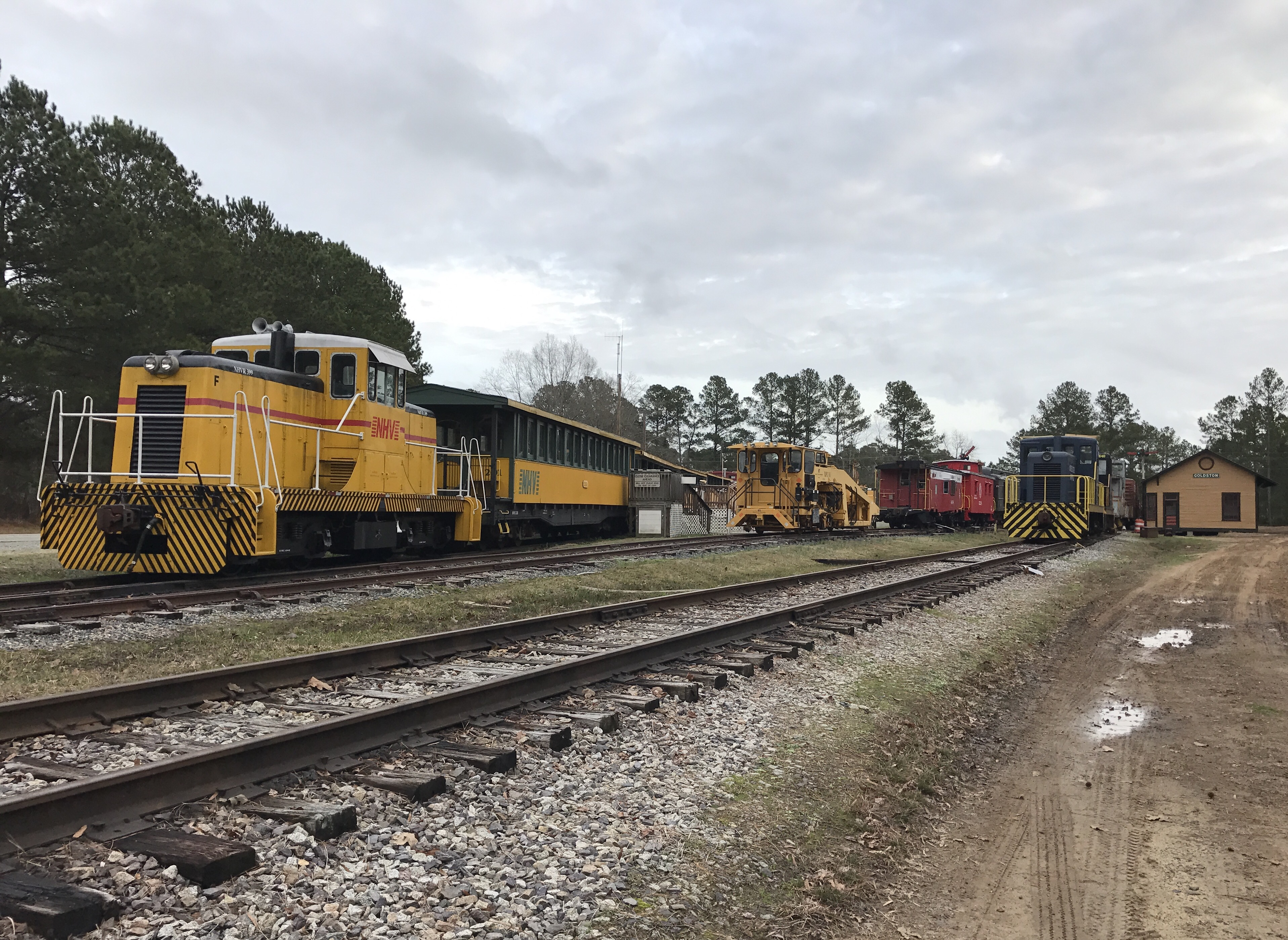
New Hope Valley Railroad museum in Bonsal

Bonsal is an unincorporated community in the New Hill, North Carolina postal district, in extreme southwestern Wake County, North Carolina, United States. Bonsal was a railroad junction between the Durham & South Carolina Railroad (D&SC) (originally chartered as the New Hope Valley Railroad) and the Seaboard Air Line Railroad (originally the Raleigh and Augusta Air Line Railroad). The New Hope Valley Railroad route was abandoned in the late 1970s.

The original name of the community was Godsey after the Godsey Farm in the area, but this was changed to Bonsal in 1905 after William Roscoe Bonsal, builder and first President of the Durham & South Carolina Railroad (see below). The community was briefly incorporated from 1907 to 1917 to allow the citizens to vote in favor of bills supporting temperance and prohibition. The town charter was revoked in 1917 when the citizens, having accomplished their purpose for being incorporated at all, refused to pay town taxes.

Bonsal is now the site of the North Carolina Railway Museum (NCRM) and the operating New Hope Valley Railway (NHVRy) tourist line. The line owns approximately 4 miles of track between Bonsal and New Hill, North Carolina, operating for passengers from March to December. Other special event trains are operated at other times throughout the year.

The railway north of New Hill, North Carolina has been converted into the American Tobacco Trail.
