= Riverbend Steam Station =

Former coal-fired electrical power plant in North Carolina

- Country: United States of America
- Location: Gaston County, North Carolina
- Coordinates: 35°21′36″N 80°58′27″W
- Status: Decommissioned
- Commission date: 1929
- Decommission date: May 2013
- Owner: Duke Energy

Thermal power station
- Primary fuel: Coal, natural gas
- Turbine technology: Steam, gas turbine
- Cooling source: Catawba River

Power generation
- Nameplate capacity: 454 MW

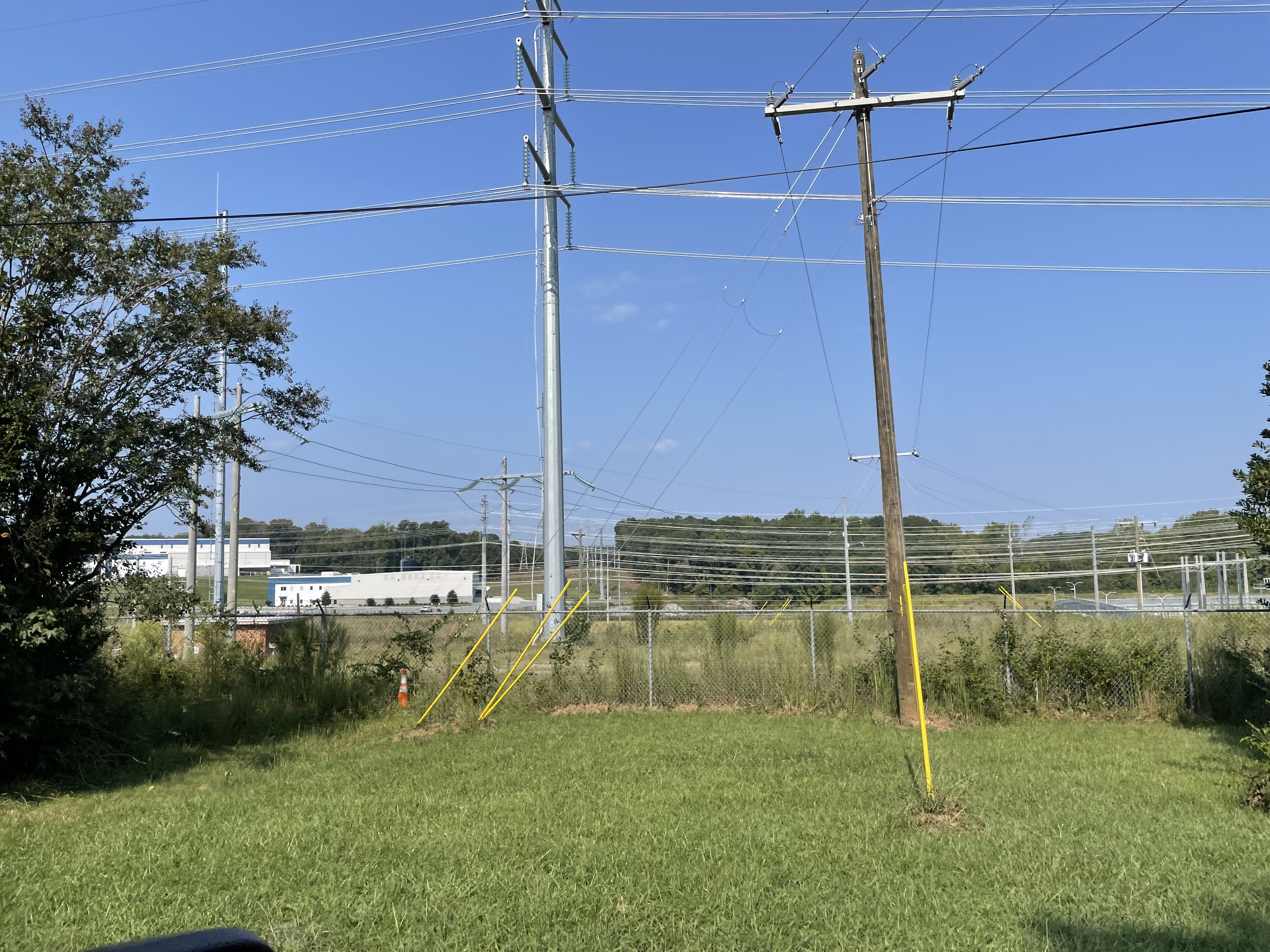
Riverbend Steam Station site after demolition

The Riverbend Steam Station was a former 454-MW coal-fired electrical power plant in Gaston County, North Carolina, owned by Duke Energy. It was originally slated for decommissioning in 2015, but was closed in April 2013. The four-unit station was named for a bend in the Catawba River on which it was located. Riverbend was considered a cycling station to be brought on line to supplement supply when electricity demand was highest. Four gas-fired combustion turbine units were also housed on the site, but were retired in October 2012. The last recognizable section of the structure and its boiler were demolished on 22 June 2018. Duke Energy claimed that coal ash basins from Riverbend Steam Station were fully excavated in March 2019.

== See also ==
- List of power stations
