= Samuel Bartley Holleman House =

Historic house in North Carolina, United States

- U.S. National Register of Historic Places
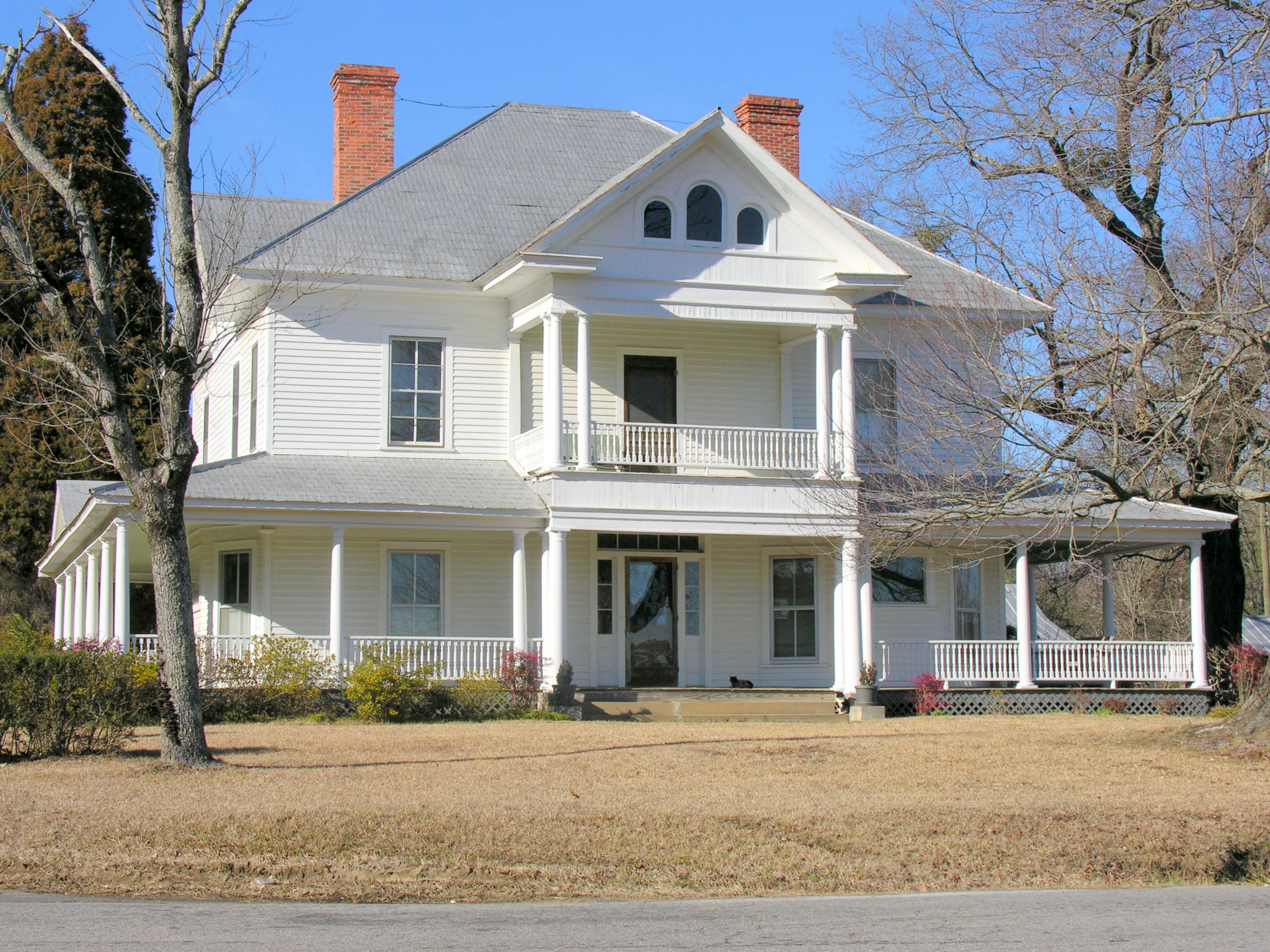

- Location within North Carolina Location within the United States
- Location: 3424 Avent Ferry Rd., New Hill, North Carolina
- Coordinates: 35°37′7″N 78°54′36″W
- Area: 1.5 acres (0.61 ha)
- Built: 1913
- Architect: Ausley, Raymond, local carpenter; Mann, Lemmie, carpenter and foreman
- Architectural style: Queen Anne, Colonial Revival
- MPS: Wake County MPS
- NRHP reference No.: 07001503
- Added to NRHP: January 30, 2008

The Samuel Bartley Holleman House is a historic home located in New Hill, North Carolina, an unincorporated community in southwestern Wake County. Constructed in 1913, the 2 1/2-story building is an example of Queen Anne and Colonial Revival architecture. Other buildings on the property include a wellhouse, pumphouse, engine house, smokehouse, and wash house.

In January 2008, the Samuel Bartley Holleman House was listed on the National Register of Historic Places.

== See also ==
- Kemil
