= W.S. Lee Steam Station =

Power plant in South Carolina

- Country: United States
- Location: Williamston vicinity, Anderson County, South Carolina
- Coordinates: 34°35′50″N 82°26′13″W
- Status: Operational
- Commission date: 1951
- Owner: Duke Energy

Thermal power station
- Primary fuel: Natural gas
- Secondary fuel: Distillate Fuel Oil

The W.S. Lee Steam Station, which was previously called the Lee Steam Station, is an electric generation station located near Williamston, South Carolina on the Saluda River. It was named for William States Lee who was chief engineer of Duke Power. He is the grandfather of William States Lee III, who was a chairman and president of Duke Power.

The plant began as a coal-fired steam plant in 1951. Coal use ended in 2014. It currently has combined-cycle natural gas turbines, a natural gas boiler, and dual-fuel, simple-cycle turbines.

== Coal Era ==
The Lee Steam Station originally had three coal-fired units with a total electrical generating capacity of 370 MW. These units had electrostatic precipitators for the control of particulate matter in the exhaust. In 2004, nitrogen oxides emission controls were installed. The station also had three combustion turbines, which were replaced by two 42 MW turbines in 2007. In 2014, two of the coal-fired units were decommissioned. The third was converted to 180 MW natural-gas boiler in 2015.

== Natural Gas Era ==
In 2018 it began operating two combined-cycle, natural-gas fired turbines. The turbines are Siemens SGT-(5000F5) equipped with dry low NO_{x} burners with selective catalytic reduction for NO_{x} control and oxidation catalysts for CO and VOC control. The natural gas boiler is equipped with low NO_{x} burners. The two simple-cycle turbines are permitted to use either natural gas or distillate fuel oil and are equipped with dual-fuel water injection for NO_{x} control. There are two multicell mechanical-draft cooling towers.

== Coal Ash ==
As with many coal burning plants, the W.S. Lee Station has coal ash basins and other combustion residuals stored onsite. There were two active ash basins, an inactive ash basin, an ash structural fill, and an ash fill totaling about 3.2 million tons of ash. A geotechnical consultant indicated in 2010 that the active basins pose a potential threat if the embankments were to fail. Duke energy said that it would excavate the inactive basin and the ash fill, remove the ash, and haul it to a landfill near Homer, Georgia. The active basins and the structural landfill would be excavated and put in a lined landfill. The plan for the inactive basin and ash fill has been published.

Status of coal ash basin closure is available for all Duke Energy plants.
