= New Hill, North Carolina =

Unincorporated community in North Carolina, US

Coordinates: 35°40′52″N 78°56′08″W

New Hill is an unincorporated community located in southwestern Wake County, North Carolina, United States, at the crossroads of old U.S. 1 (State Road 1011, running northeast–southwest), New Hill Olive Chapel Road (running north) and New Hill Holleman Road (running south). New Hill is located along the original alignment of the New Hope Valley Railway between Durham and Bonsal. The ZIP Code for New Hill is 27562.

The community is near the southern terminus of the American Tobacco Trail. It is also the location of Duke Energy Progress's Shearon Harris nuclear power plant and the associated Harris Lake recreation center.

A regional wastewater reclamation project has been completed in the area. The project was opposed by local residents who believed that placing the facility in the middle of their community would adversely impact their way of life. A settlement was reached in early 2011 between the towns building the plant and the New Hill community.

The Samuel Bartley Holleman House and New Hill Historic District are listed on the National Register of Historic Places.
