= Dan River Steam Station =

Power station in Eden, North Carolina

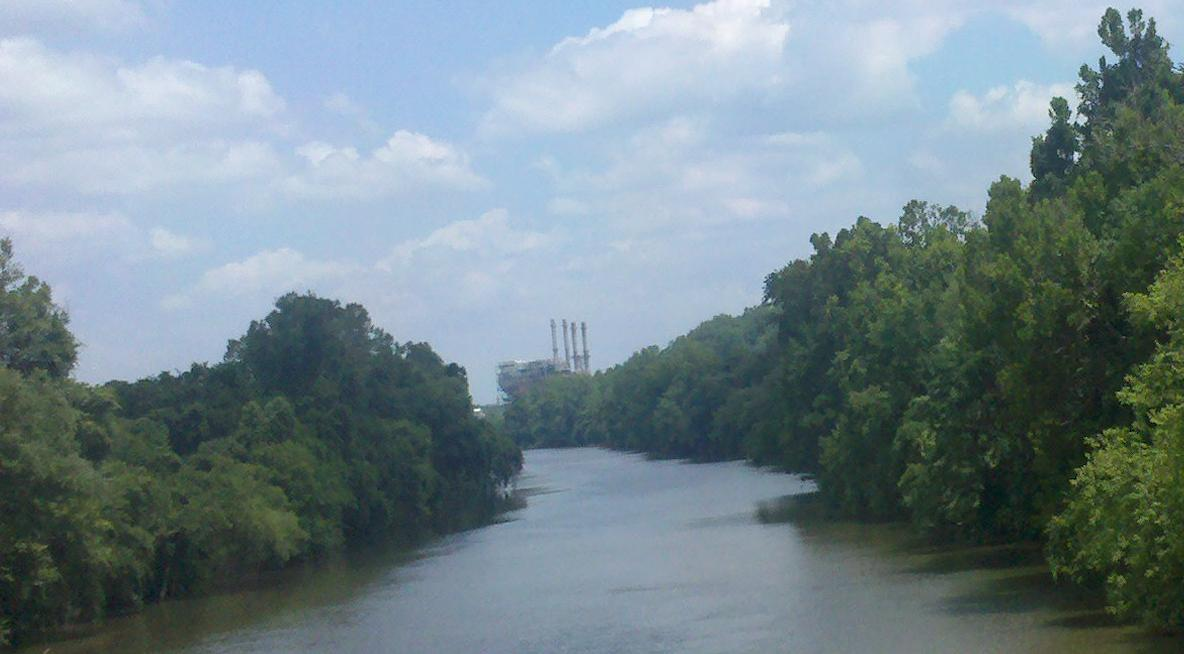
- View of the Dan River Steam Station from NC Highway 14 in Eden, NC.
- Country: United States of America
- Location: Eden, North Carolina
- Coordinates: 36.487°N 79.718°W
- Status: Operational
- Commission date: 1949
- Owner: Duke Energy

Thermal power station
- Primary fuel: Natural gas
- Turbine technology: Steam, gas turbine
- Cooling source: Dan River
- Combined cycle?: Planned

Power generation
- Nameplate capacity: 276 MW, 620 MW planned

The Dan River Steam Station is a power plant in Eden, North Carolina, owned by Duke Energy. The plant comprises three natural gas-fueled combustion turbines, which began operation in 1968.). Two natural-gas fueled combined cycle turbines are planned for the near future. A coal-fired electrical power plant at the site ceased operation in 2012.

== History ==
The Dan River Steam Station began construction in 1949, and was finished the following year. Coal units 1 and 2 cost a combined $15 million and were, at the time, cutting-edge. The third unit was added six years later, and two natural gas-fueled combined cycle turbines are planned for the near future.

The station was the object of a 1971 United States Supreme Court Case, Griggs v. Duke Power Co., in which African-American employees contended that they were discriminated against when Duke required them to possess a high school diploma and/or pass a standardized general intelligence test in order to obtain certain positions at the station, neither of which was found to have bearing on the employee's ability to perform the sought positions. At that time, the education requirements were disproportionately harming African-Americans and the well paying positions were only being filled by white employees. The Court found that the education requirements would only be legal under Title VII if they were reasonably related to the job in question. Therefore, because the education requirements were not reasonably related to the jobs, they were not proper.

=== Coal plant closure ===
The coal-fired plant ceased operation in 2012, and Duke Energy completed demolition of the coal plant buildings in 2017.

=== 2014 Coal ash spill ===
On February 2, 2014, a drainage pipe for a coal ash containment pond burst, sending 39,000 tons of coal ash into the Dan River and causing extensive water pollution. In addition to the coal ash, 27 million gallons of wastewater from the plant was also released into the river. Duke Energy later pled guilty to criminal negligence in its handling of coal ash at the Dan River Plant and at other facilities, and paid substantial fines. In addition, the states affected launched a lawsuit on July 18, 2019, asking that the court declare Duke Energy responsible for the damage done to the environment by the spill.

== Addition of combined cycle turbines ==
In 2007, Duke Energy began to pursue permission to add two new combined cycle, natural gas-fired, 620 MW generating units to its fleet: one at the Dan River Steam Station, the other at the Buck Steam Station in Rowan County. This was done in order to diversify the company's fuel sources, expand its generating capacity, and to modernize its energy generation by moving away from less efficient, more polluting coal. After the two turbines were added, the three older coal units went offline in 2012.

== See also ==
- List of power stations in the United States
