= Shearon Harris Nuclear Power Plant =

Nuclear power plant located in New Hill, North Carolina

Harris Nuclear Plant
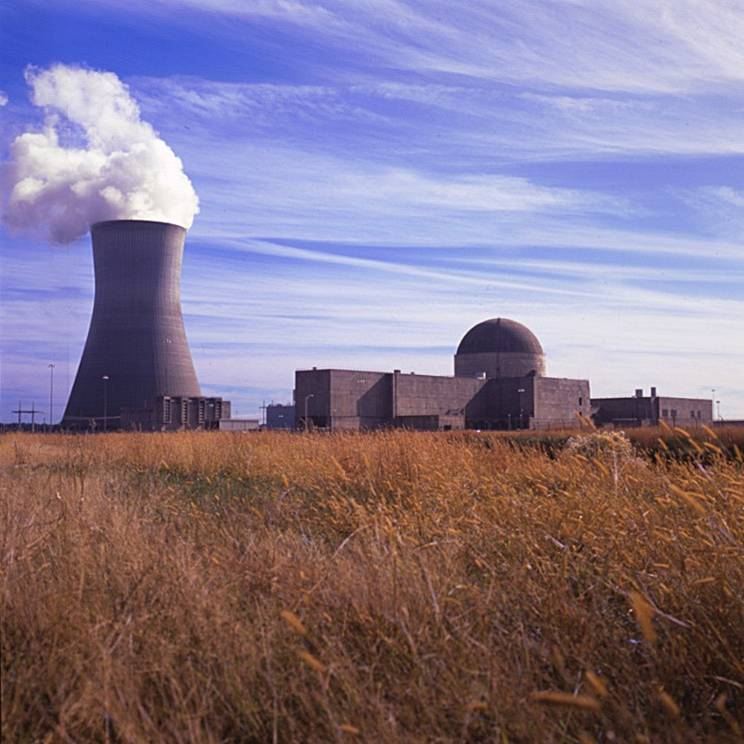
- Shearon Harris Unit 1
- Official name: Harris Nuclear Plant
- Country: United States
- Location: New Hill, Wake County, North Carolina
- Coordinates: 35°38.0′N 78°57.3′W
- Status: Operational
- Construction began: January 28, 1978
- Commission date: May 2, 1987
- Construction cost: $4.115 billion (2007 USD)
- Owner: Duke Energy
- Operator: Duke Energy

Nuclear power station
- Reactor type: PWR
- Reactor supplier: Westinghouse
- Cooling towers: 1 × Natural Draft
- Cooling source: Harris Lake
- Thermal capacity: 1 × 2948 MW_{th}

Power generation
- Units operational: 1 × 928 MW
- Make and model: WH 3-loop (DRYAMB)
- Units cancelled: 3 × 900 MW; 2 × 1117 MW AP1000
- Nameplate capacity: 928 MW
- Capacity factor: 101% (2017); 89.0% (lifetime)
- Annual net output: 7986 GWh (2021)

External links
- Website: Harris Nuclear Plant Fact Sheet
- Commons: Related media on Commons

The Harris Nuclear Plant is a nuclear power plant with a single Westinghouse designed pressurized-water nuclear reactor operated by Duke Energy. It was named in honor of W. Shearon Harris, former president of Carolina Power & Light (predecessor of Progress Energy Inc.). Located in New Hill, North Carolina, in the United States, about 20 miles (30 km) southwest of Raleigh, it generates 900 MWe, uses a 523-foot (160 m) natural draft cooling tower for cooling, and uses Harris Lake for cooling tower makeup, shutdown and emergency cooling. The reactor achieved criticality in January 1987 and began providing power commercially on May 2 of that year.

The Shearon Harris site was originally designed for four reactors (and still has the space available for them), but only one was built. The final cost approached $3.9B, including safety upgrades mandated after the Three Mile Island accident.

On November 16, 2006, the operator applied to the Nuclear Regulatory Commission (NRC) for a renewal and extension of the plant's operating license. The NRC granted the renewal on December 17, 2008, extending the license from forty years to sixty.

== History ==
=== Refurbished generator from Three Mile Island ===
On January 22, 2010, officials at the Nuclear Regulatory Commission announced the electrical generator from the damaged Unit 2 reactor at Three Mile Island would be used at Shearon Harris. The generator was refurbished and installed during a refueling outage in November, 2010.

=== Units 2 and 3 ===
On February 19, 2008 Progress filed an application with the Nuclear Regulatory Commission (NRC) for a Combined Construction and Operating License (COL). It seeks to build two 1,100 MWe Westinghouse AP1000 pressurized water reactors. Although the NRC had already certified the AP1000 design, the application review was expected to take about 36 months. The new reactors would not be operational before 2018.

Expansion of the plant would require raising the water level of Harris Lake by 20 feet, decreasing the size of Wake County's largest park, with the Cape Fear River as a backup water source.

On May 2, 2013, Duke submitted a request to the NRC to suspend review of the Harris Units 2 and 3 Combined License Application (COLA), effectively halting further development of this project. Duke has determined the forecast operating dates of the proposed reactors falls outside the fifteen-year planning horizon utilized by state regulators in their demonstration of need evaluation. The COLA remains docketed, however, leaving the door open for Duke to restart activities.

== Electricity production ==
Generation (MWh) of Shearon Harris Nuclear Power Plant
Year	Jan	Feb	Mar	Apr	May	Jun	Jul	Aug	Sep	Oct	Nov	Dec	Annual (Total)
2001	651,550	587,897	650,961	600,053	641,046	612,514	633,035	632,278	392,127	-7,612	-7,423	-17,930	5,368,496
2002	596,616	605,885	692,186	664,354	685,426	656,254	587,765	633,905	657,210	687,635	670,898	696,922	7,835,056
2003	697,798	628,360	692,040	550,040	200,220	585,862	675,487	566,282	586,953	690,227	668,416	695,419	7,237,104
2004	696,104	651,056	691,524	640,461	378,332	655,523	674,118	676,491	658,386	324,248	268,635	693,550	7,008,428
2005	691,938	627,883	693,146	663,595	577,180	654,438	670,675	671,369	652,216	669,072	664,739	694,577	7,930,828
2006	691,473	624,282	689,215	144,735	256,719	651,468	665,897	665,520	588,819	689,625	669,468	692,047	7,029,268
2007	691,771	626,054	685,273	660,878	678,022	648,431	666,547	661,605	600,239	137,065	667,641	679,524	7,403,050
2008	692,158	644,233	684,058	661,179	679,592	648,293	672,513	436,426	656,281	686,147	668,900	691,631	7,821,411
2009	693,809	624,890	688,165	342,241	441,456	659,020	680,311	678,090	657,569	689,492	551,057	697,061	7,403,161
2010	690,254	632,140	695,980	666,054	685,081	654,660	677,181	677,639	653,802	11,904	336,596	699,324	7,080,615
2011	695,889	622,800	697,118	668,969	685,747	657,595	676,763	678,847	661,806	693,847	675,050	697,696	8,112,127
2012	700,273	654,589	692,354	421,429	-7,575	461,809	691,734	698,837	681,896	711,705	692,239	715,075	7,114,365
2013	716,430	638,321	692,542	683,333	324,651	512,112	696,829	645,140	656,853	708,893	175,051	438,208	6,888,363
2014	606,998	645,639	714,360	684,365	535,765	670,317	696,617	698,502	678,978	709,000	692,342	715,692	8,048,575
2015	716,758	650,304	712,106	15,096	333,847	671,653	695,019	696,555	677,127	706,975	692,525	704,212	7,272,177
2016	716,122	673,699	712,660	687,985	706,362	676,975	695,043	696,569	672,401	136,077	416,053	723,105	7,513,051
2017	721,046	643,988	717,641	688,333	709,239	680,788	698,805	701,133	674,279	556,960	697,080	719,281	8,208,573
2018	593,388	643,338	715,370	128,815	459,520	701,420	724,583	723,583	701,214	733,607	721,164	741,912	7,587,914
2019	744,045	669,919	737,793	704,407	720,979	691,860	708,692	710,988	687,739	221,209	268,342	744,621	7,610,594
2020	743,483	694,486	677,007	716,207	735,529	621,287	716,872	649,871	702,747	732,024	715,179	570,901	8,275,593
2021	741,049	668,251	740,789	529,499	364,993	605,624	721,395	719,843	702,654	732,369	720,298	739,969	7,986,733
2022	745,709	670,409	739,405	671,858	725,765	699,163	716,382	647,562	664,683	137,936	645,005	742,990	7,806,867
2023	741,992	668,811	734,224	710,874	731,938	700,064	715,365	716,767	699,286	731,613	716,949	741,395	8,609,278
2024	742,742	694,339	701,460	170,660	384,408	676,253	715,700	718,372	699,023	731,936	713,236	742,331	7,690,460
2025	745,090	670,509	735,820	706,874	726,558	692,738	711,088	716,413	693,969	55,907	634,639	740,950	7,830,555
2026	742,457	669,608	731,186	700,965	727,049	694,714	713,080	695,040					--

== Reactor data ==
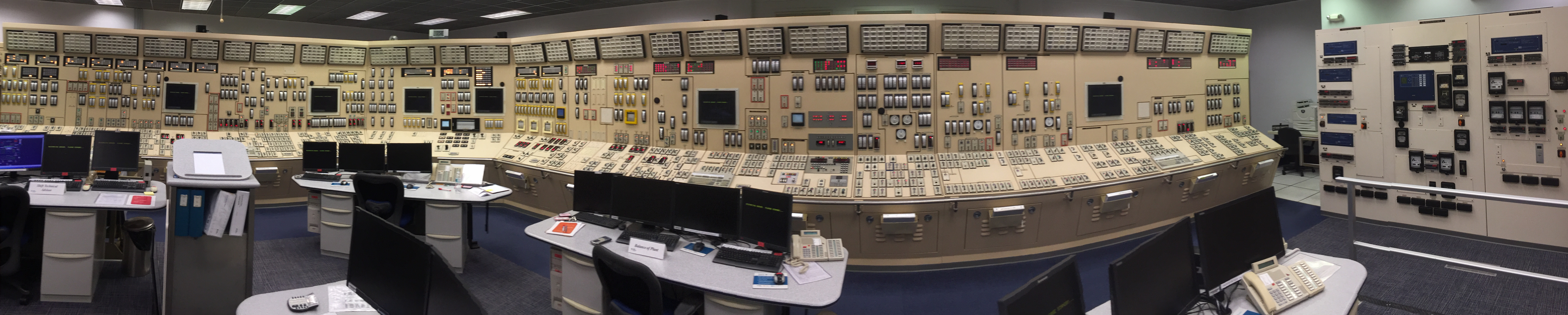

The Shearon Harris Nuclear Power Plant consists of one operational reactor. Three additional units were cancelled. Two additional reactors were planned and cancelled in 2013.

Reactor unit	Reactor type	Capacity(MW)		Construction started	Electricity grid connection	Commercial operation	Shutdown
Reactor unit	Reactor type	Net	Gross	Construction started	Electricity grid connection	Commercial operation	Shutdown
Shearon Harris-1	Westinghouse 3-loop	900	960	28 January 1978	19 January 1987	2 May 1987	
Shearon Harris-2	Westinghouse 3-loop	900	960	1 January 1978	Cancelled construction on 1 December 1983		
Shearon Harris-3	Westinghouse 3-loop	900	960	1 January 1978	Cancelled construction on 1 December 1981		
Shearon Harris-4	Westinghouse 3-loop	900	960	1 January 1978	Cancelled construction on 1 December 1981		
Shearon Harris-2 (cancelled)	AP1000	1117	?				
Shearon Harris-3 (cancelled)	AP1000	1117	?				

== Safety ==
=== Nuclear Regulatory Commission inspections ===
As of September 2017, the Harris plant is one of three out of the 99 plants in the country to have no Nuclear Regulatory Commission (NRC) findings during the past 4 quarters of inspections.

The NRC's risk estimate for an earthquake intense enough to cause core damage to the reactor at Shearon Harris was 1 in 434,783, according to an NRC study published in August 2010.

=== Surrounding population ===
The Nuclear Regulatory Commission defines two emergency planning zones around nuclear power plants: a plume exposure pathway zone with a radius of 10 miles (16 km), concerned primarily with exposure to, and inhalation of, airborne radioactive contamination, and an ingestion pathway zone of about 50 miles (80 km), concerned primarily with ingestion of food and liquid contaminated by radioactivity.

The 2010 U.S. population within 10 miles (16 km) of Shearon Harris was 96,401, an increase of 62.6 percent in a decade, according to an analysis of U.S. Census data for msnbc.com. The 2010 U.S. population within 50 miles (80 km) was 2,562,573, an increase of 26.0 percent since 2000. Cities within 50 miles include Raleigh (21 miles to city center), Durham (24 miles to city center), and Fayetteville (39 miles to city center).

During FEMA's most recent evaluation of state and local government's plans and preparedness included emergency operations for the plant, no deficiencies or areas requiring corrective actions were identified.

=== NC-WARN concerns ===
The anti-nuclear group "N.C. Waste Awareness and Reduction Network" (NC-WARN) questioned the facility's safety and security record calling it "insufficient" and claiming "it is the most dangerous nuclear plant in the US". However, the plant's technical and security systems have passed all Nuclear Regulatory Commission (NRC) standards as of 2008, including protection and security, and no worker or area resident has been injured as a result of the plant's operation.

=== Spent fuel pools ===
In 2010, Project Censored, a non-profit, investigative journalism project, ranked the safety issues at Shearon Harris the 4th most under-reported story of the year, because of the risk of fires at what are the largest spent-fuel pools in the country:

Between 1999 and 2003, there were twelve major problems requiring the shutdown of the plant. According to the NRC, the national average for commercial reactors is one shutdown per eighteen months.... Congressman David Price of North Carolina sent the NRC a report by scientists at MIT and Princeton that pinpointed the waste pools as the biggest risk at the plant. "Spent fuel recently discharged from a reactor could heat up relatively rapidly and catch fire," wrote Bob Alvarez, a former advisor to the Department of Energy and co-author of the report. "The fire could well spread to older fuel. The long-term land contamination consequences of such an event could be significantly worse than Chernobyl."

In August 2007, NC WARN dropped a lawsuit against Progress Energy that was intended to delay or prevent expansion of Shearon Harris, claiming that continuing the legal battle would cost at least $200,000.

=== Unplanned shutdown ===
On May 16, 2013, Shearon Harris Unit 1 initiated an unplanned shutdown when reviews of ultrasonic data from a refueling outage in spring 2012 determined a 1/4" flaw was inside the 6"-thick Reactor Pressure Vessel Head. The flaw was near the nozzle for a control rod drive mechanism and attributed to primary water stress corrosion cracking, though no actual leakage was detected. Due to high radiation levels, the repairs required robotic aid. A brand new reactor vessel head was installed November 2019.
