= Salisbury Township, Rowan County, North Carolina =

Township in Rowan County, North Carolina, U.S.

Coordinates: 35°40′19″N 80°27′49″W

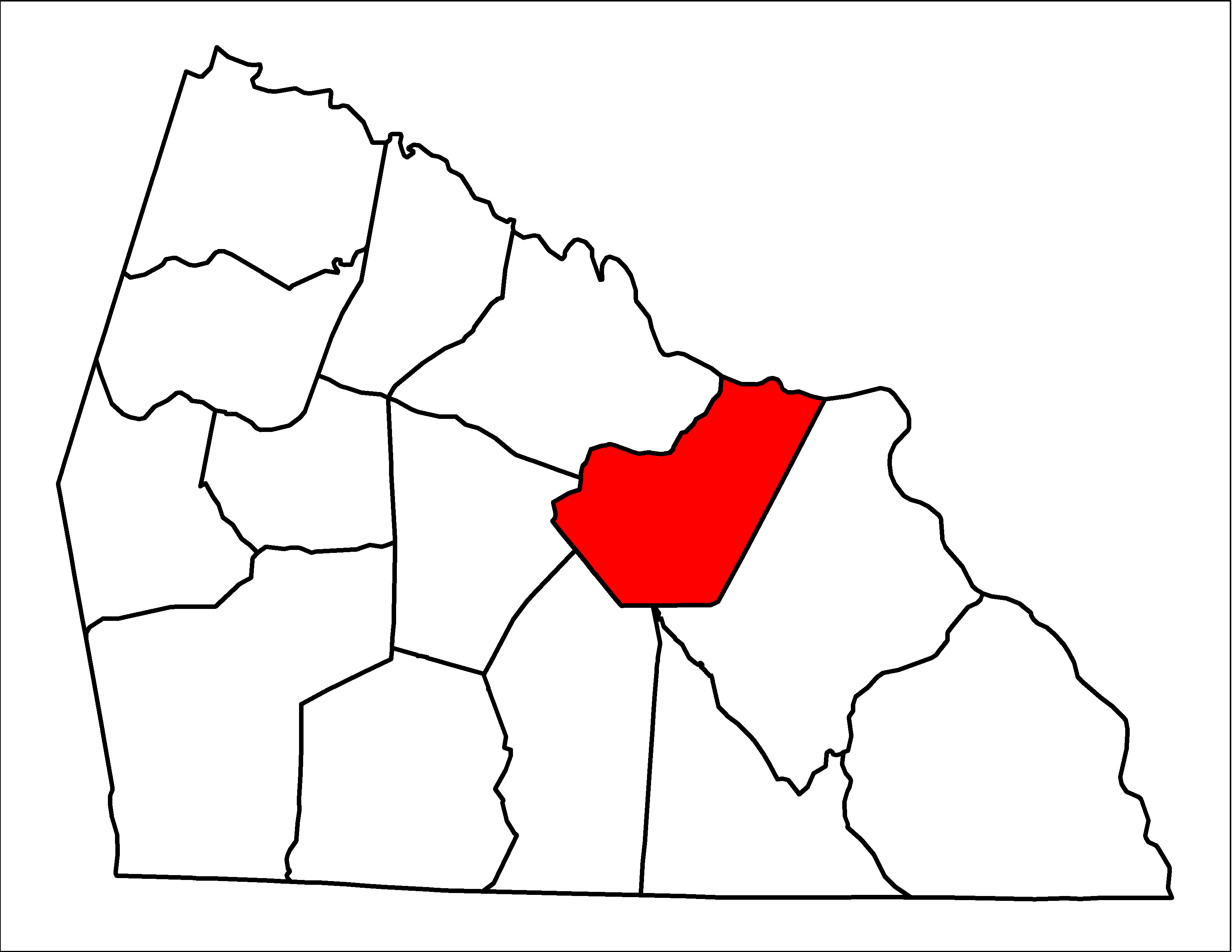
Location of Salisbury Township in Rowan County, N.C.

Salisbury Township is one of fourteen townships in Rowan County, North Carolina, United States. The township had a population of 28,594 according to the 2000 census and is currently the most populous township in Rowan County.

Geographically, Salisbury Township occupies 30.64 square miles (79.4 km^{2}) in central Rowan County. Large portions of the city of Salisbury, the county seat of Rowan County are located in the township. In addition, the towns of Spencer, East Spencer, and a small portion of the town Granite Quarry are located in Salisbury Township. The township's northern border is formed by the Yadkin River.
