= American Tobacco Trail =

Rails-to-Trails project in North Carolina, U.S.

Coordinates: 35°59′25.71″N 78°54′22.75″W

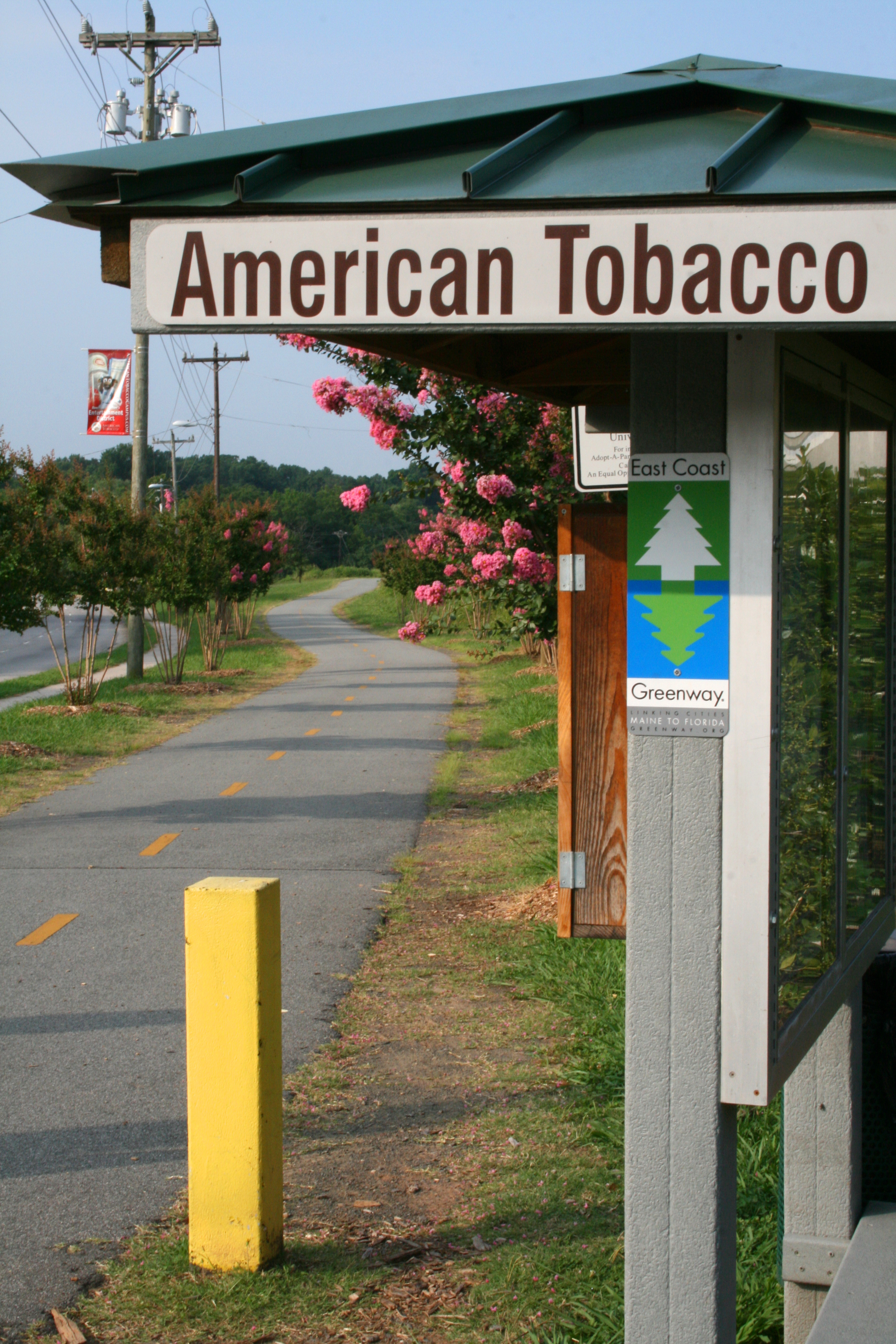
- American Tobacco Trail terminus in Durham
- Length: 22.6 mi (36.4 km)
- Location: North Carolina
- Trailheads: across Morehead Avenue from the Durham Bulls Athletic Park to Ragan Rd., Wake County
- Use: Multi-use
- Difficulty: Easy
- Season: Year-round

The American Tobacco Trail (ATT) is a 22.6-mile (36.4 km) long Rails-to-Trails project located in the Research Triangle region of North Carolina, running along an abandoned railroad bed originally built for the American Tobacco Company in the 1970s. The route crosses through portions of Durham County (including the City of Durham), Chatham County, and Wake County (including the Town of Cary, North Carolina). The ATT is part of the East Coast Greenway and is open to pedestrians, cyclists, equestrians (in non-urban sections) and other non-motorized users.

Starting from the southern end of the trail in New Hill, the 6.5 mile Wake County portion of the trail is gravel, followed by a 4.7-mile multi-use section in Chatham County that contains a paved lane and a gravel (equestrian lane); the northernmost 11.4-mile paved section in Durham County on the north end of the trail ends at the Durham Bulls Athletic Park (DBAP).

The 4.7-mile Chatham County section of the trail was built, and is managed, by the Town of Cary (which resides in both Wake and Chatham counties).

== Route ==
=== Durham County ===
The ATT traverses 11.4 miles (18.3 km) in Durham County, North Carolina. The trail's northern terminus lies in the city of Durham across Morehead Avenue from the Durham Bulls Athletic Park. Within the city, the trail is a 10-foot (3.0 m) wide asphalt paved greenway with loose gravel shoulders. It is open to walkers, cyclists, rollerbladers and wheelchair users, but not equestrians.

The American Tobacco Trail runs through the city of Durham south to the Chatham county line, crossing over I-40 near The Streets at Southpoint mall. A pedestrian bridge was erected over I-40 in April 2013, connecting the northern and southern segments of the Durham County portion of the trail, but due to construction errors, did not open until February 2014. This segment of the ATT within Durham County is a designated portion of the East Coast Greenway.

=== Chatham County ===
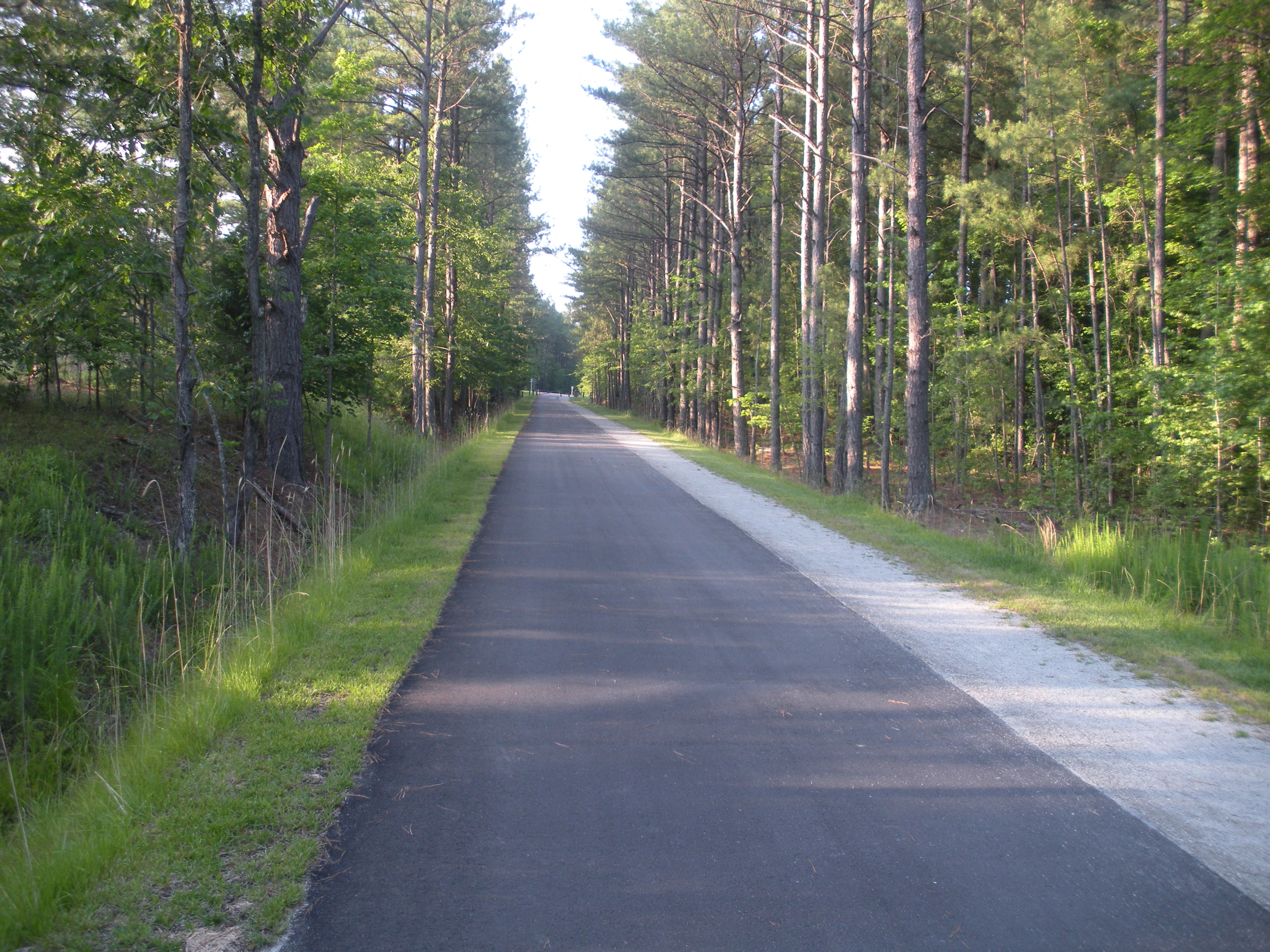
Typical section of the ATT in Chatham County.

The ATT traverses 4.7 miles (7.6 km) in Chatham County, North Carolina. Once the trail crosses into Chatham county, the trail converts to a dual surface of asphalt and compacted screenings. The trail is open for foot, bike and equestrian use by TRTC. The trail crosses Northeast Creek and O'Kelly Chapel Road, past the Old Chatham Golf Course. It also traverses the end of Pittard Sears Road, Panther Creek, and continues past New Hope Church Road.

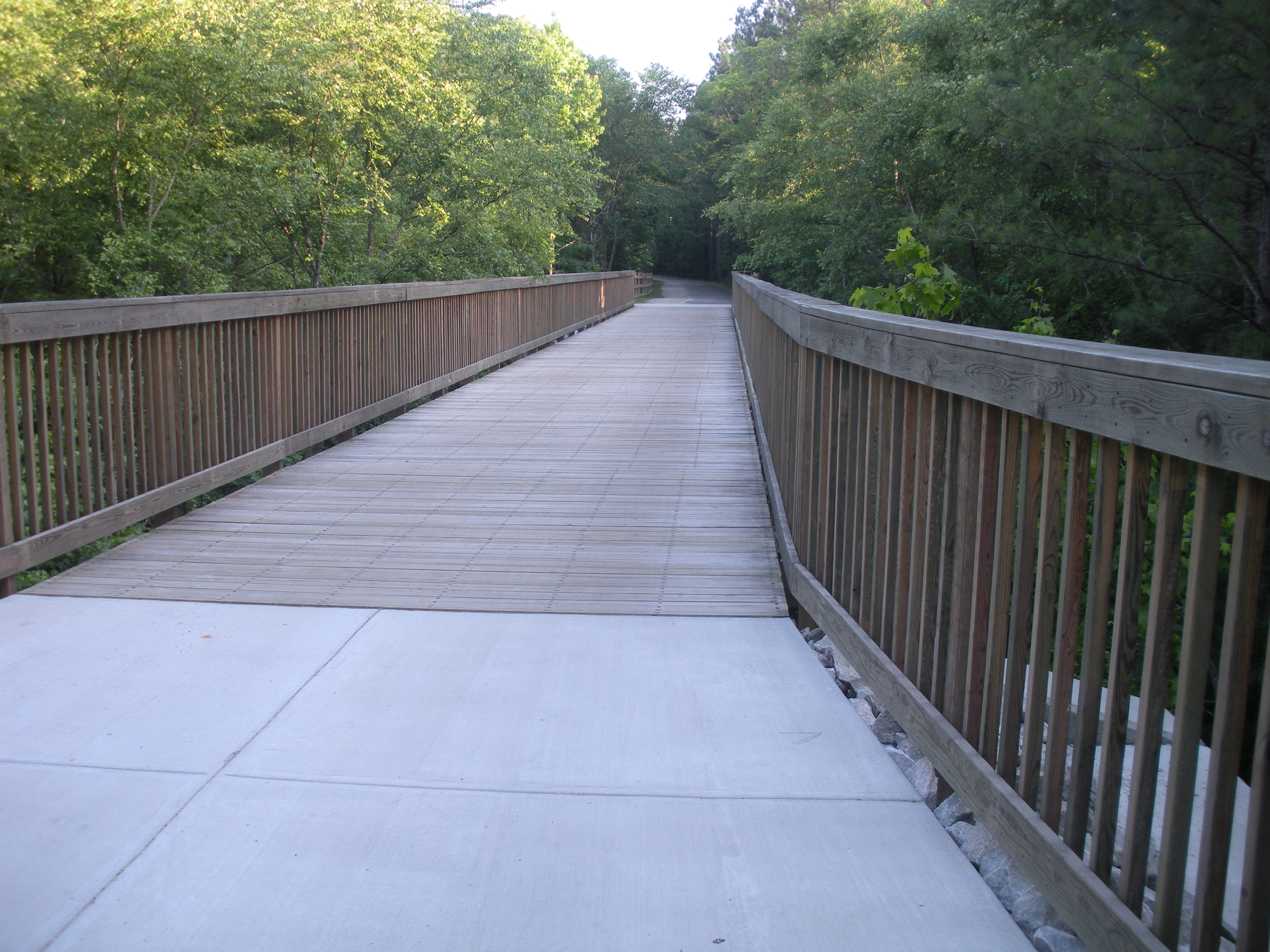
The ATT crosses Panther Creek in Chatham County.

=== Wake County ===
The ATT traverses 6.4 miles (10.3 km) in Wake County, North Carolina. The Wake County portion of the ATT is approximately 10-foot (3.0 m) wide with a granite screening surface. The trail is open to hikers, cyclists, wheelchair users and equestrians. Users can access this portion of the greenway most conveniently at 2575 New Hope Church Rd, Cary, NC.

In total, 16.1 miles (25.9 km) of continuous paved trail is usable in the northernmost portion and 6.5 miles (10.5 km) of continuous unpaved trail is usable in the southernmost portion.

== History ==
J.B. Duke founded the American Tobacco Company in 1890, which subsequently acquired the Lucky Strike Company and over 200 other firms. The company built processing plants and warehouses in Durham which were served by several rail lines built in 1905. The rail line to the south which is now the ATT, connected from Durham to Bonsal, NC and onwards to Duncan. It was known as the New Hope Valley Railway and later Durham & South Carolina (it never got as far as SC), and later became part of the Norfolk Southern Railway system. In the 1970s the U.S. Army Corps of Engineers built the Jordan Lake reservoir in Chatham County necessitating the relocation of a large portion of the tracks. A portion of the original right-of-way is presently a natural surface trail accessible off of Stagecoach Rd. in Durham. A new rail line was built on higher ground a few miles to the east. However, only about 10 years later, the tracks were removed from this new railroad as Norfolk Southern had been bought out, and trains could access the American Tobacco complex via the Southern Railway more economically.

The Triangle Rails-to-Trails Conservancy Inc. (TRTC), founded in 1989, aimed to preserve abandoned railroad corridors in North Carolina's Triangle area for future transportation and recreational use, particularly through rail-to-trail conversions. TRTC's first president, Jon Parker, and his successor, John Goebel, along with Robert Payne, Al Capehart, Libby Searles, and Rick Burt, secured funding to develop the American Tobacco Trail (ATT), a 22-mile trail spanning Durham, Wake, and Chatham counties on the former Norfolk & Southern railroad line. The project's early stages, beginning with a $2,500 grant, involved extensive planning led by Greenways Incorporated and collaboration with the North Carolina Department of Transportation (NCDOT), local governments, and various organizations.

In 1994, TRTC leadership passed to Tom Mappes, who coordinated planning efforts to address trail design challenges, such as the I-40 “gap” and widening standards. Advocacy from Leslie Kennedy and the NC Horse Council led to the construction of a tunnel under US Hwy 64 to maintain the trail's continuity in Wake County. Sig Hutchinson and the Triangle Greenways Council envisioned a connected network of trails, incorporating the ATT as a key segment. Curt Devereux and Rick Burt contributed by maintaining TRTC's website and newsletters, while Bill Bussey later led TRTC, overseeing continuous improvements and community engagement efforts.

The ATT officially opened in phases, starting in Durham in the year 2000, followed by sections in Wake and Chatham counties. Key milestones included the addition of a 3.2-mile section in 2002, a 3.5-mile equestrian-friendly segment in Wake County in 2003, and federally funded expansions secured by Congressman David Price, which helped complete the Chatham section by 2010. The final Durham section, featuring a pedestrian bridge over I-40, was completed in 2014.

TRTC continues to advocate for the ATT and related projects, including the Timberlake and Duke Beltline Corridors, expanding recreational and transportation opportunities in the region.

== See also ==
- New Hope Valley Railway - tourist railroad at the south end of the ATT
- Ellerbe Creek Trail - pedestrian/bicycle greenway north of the ATT
