= New Hill Historic District =

Historic district in North Carolina, United States

- U.S. National Register of Historic Places
- U.S. Historic district
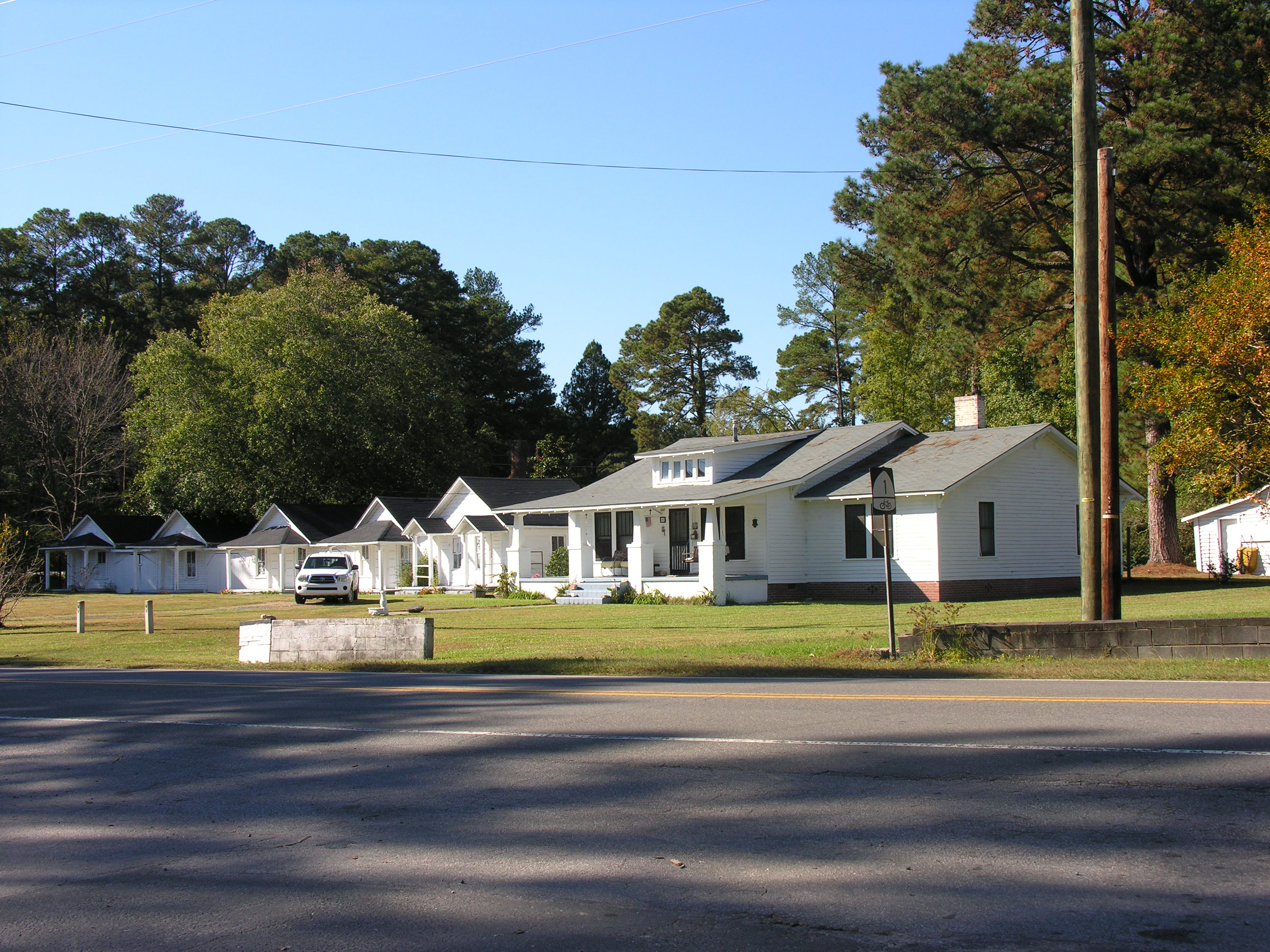
- W. T. Roundy Motor Court and a nearby house

- Location within North Carolina Location within the United States
- Location: Roughly 0.5 S of jct. of Old US 1 and NC 1127, and 2 mi. W of jct. with Old US 1, New Hill, North Carolina
- Coordinates: 35°40′48″N 78°56′26″W
- Area: 282 acres (114 ha)
- Built: 1860
- Architectural style: Colonial Revival, Tudor Revival
- NRHP reference No.: 01000426
- Added to NRHP: April 25, 2001

The New Hill Historic District is a national historic district located at New Hill, North Carolina, an unincorporated community in southwestern Wake County. The district encompasses the commercial and residential center and includes 2,820 acres (11.4 km^{2}), 59 buildings, and one structure. The district developed between about 1860 and 1950, and includes notable examples of Colonial Revival and Tudor Revival style architecture. Notable buildings include the W. T. Roundy commercial complex, C.J. Bright's general merchandise store or New Hill Emporium, W. T. Roundy House (c. 1928), Duncan Lashley House (c. 1860), John Bright House (c. 1912), New Hill Baptist Church (c. 1888), Glass-Gardner House (c. 1890), and several farm complexes.

It was listed on the National Register of Historic Places in 2001.

== See also ==
- List of Registered Historic Places in North Carolina
