= 2011 Iowa Barnstormers season =

Arena Football League team season

- Head coach: John Gregory (resigned May 17); J. T. Smith (interim)
- Home stadium: Wells Fargo Arena

Results
- Record: 5–13
- Division place: 5th NC Central
- Playoffs: Did not qualify

The 2011 Iowa Barnstormers season was the 11th season for the franchise, and the 7th in the Arena Football League. The team was coached by J. T. Smith, who took over as interim head coach on May 17 after John Gregory resigned. The Barnstormers played their home games at Wells Fargo Arena.

== Standings ==
Central Division
Team	W	L	PCT	PF	PA	DIV	CON	Home	Away
y-Chicago Rush	13	5	.722	957	833	6–2	9–3	7–2	6–3
x-Dallas Vigilantes	11	7	.611	1061	1007	6–2	7–5	6–3	5–4
Tulsa Talons	8	10	.444	894	899	3–5	4–7	4–5	4–5
Kansas City Command	6	12	.333	854	974	3–5	4–9	4–4	2–7
Iowa Barnstormers	5	13	.278	916	1116	2–6	5–7	4–5	1–8

y - Clinched division
x - Clinched playoff berth

== Regular season schedule ==
The Barnstormers had a bye week in Week 1, and so they began the season on the road against the Pittsburgh Power on March 19. Their home opener was on March 25 against the Spokane Shock. On July 23, they hosted the Georgia Force in their final regular season game.

Week	Day	Date	Kickoff	Opponent	Results		Location	Report
Week	Day	Date	Kickoff	Opponent	Score	Record	Location	Report
1	Bye							
2	Saturday	March 19	6:30 PM	at Pittsburgh Power	L 28–58	0–1	Consol Energy Center	
3	Friday	March 25	7:00 PM	Spokane Shock	W 43–42	1–1	Wells Fargo Arena	
4	Friday	April 1	9:30 PM	at San Jose SaberCats	W 76–69	2–1	HP Pavilion at San Jose	
5	Saturday	April 9	7:30 PM	at Kansas City Command	L 48–62	2–2	Sprint Center	
6	Saturday	April 16	7:05 PM	Chicago Rush	L 49–50	2–3	Wells Fargo Arena	
7	Saturday	April 23	7:00 PM	at Tulsa Talons	L 60–61	2–4	BOK Center	
8	Saturday	April 30	7:05 PM	Philadelphia Soul	L 62–76	2–5	Wells Fargo Arena	
9	Friday	May 6	7:30 PM	at Dallas Vigilantes	L 57–71	2–6	American Airlines Center	
10	Friday	May 13	7:00 PM	at Jacksonville Sharks	L 27–79	2–7	Jacksonville Veterans Memorial Arena	
11	Bye							
12	Friday	May 27	7:05 PM	Utah Blaze	W 50–48	3–7	Wells Fargo Arena	
13	Saturday	June 4	7:05 PM	Orlando Predators	L 61–77	3–8	Wells Fargo Arena	
14	Saturday	June 11	7:05 PM	at Arizona Rattlers	L 41–61	3–9	US Airways Center	
15	Saturday	June 18	7:05 PM	Dallas Vigilantes	L 55–65	3–10	Wells Fargo Arena	
16	Sunday	June 26	3:00 PM	at Chicago Rush	L 48–58	3–11	Allstate Arena	
17	Friday	July 1	7:05 PM	Tulsa Talons	W 55–53	4–11	Wells Fargo Arena	
18	Saturday	July 9	7:05 PM	Kansas City Command	W 48–40	5–11	Wells Fargo Arena	
19	Friday	July 15	7:00 PM	at Milwaukee Mustangs	L 49–83	5–12	Bradley Center	
20	Saturday	July 23	7:05 PM	Georgia Force	L 59–63	5–13	Wells Fargo Arena	

== Roster ==
2011 Iowa Barnstormers roster
Quarterbacks: 15 Bryan Lee-Lauduski; 4 Brian Villanueva; Fullbacks: 34 Rodney Filer; Wide receivers: 41 Marquis Hamilton; 3 Dusty Kain; 12 Everett Roberts; 22 Jesse Schmidt	Offensive linemen: 52 Terence Crosby; 60 Paul Fenaroli; 66 Cornelius Lewis; 57 Pete Traynor; Defensive linemen: 44 Brent Curvey; 50 John Jackson; 9 Brandon Sesay	Linebackers: 14 Denayne Dixon; 35 E. J. Peterson; 6 Sam Smith; Defensive backs: 19 Craig James; 8 Travon Johnson; 20 Cameron McGlenn; Kickers: 11 Nich Pertuit	Injury Reserve: 7 Brad Banks QB (IR); Refused to report: Currently vacant; League Suspension: Currently vacant; Team Suspension: Currently vacant; Recallable reassignment: Currently vacant; Rookies in italics; Roster updated July 23, 2011; 22 Active, 0 Inactive

== Regular season ==
=== Week 2: at Pittsburgh Power ===
Week 2: Iowa Barnstormers at Pittsburgh Power – Game summary

Quarter	1	2	3	4	Total
Barnstormers	7	7	7	7	28
Power	14	14	13	17	58

at Consol Energy Center, Pittsburgh, Pennsylvania

- Date: March 19
- Game time: 6:30 p.m. CDT
- Game attendance: 9,190
- Referee: Jim Corpora
- Recap

Game information

1st quarter

- Pittsburgh – (7:53) Joshua Rue 1-yard run (Paul Edinger kick), Pittsburgh 7–0
- Iowa – (5:06) Todd Blythe 34-yard pass from Brad Banks (Piotr Czech kick), Tied 7–7
- Pittsburgh – (2:18) Irving Campbell 24-yard pass from Bernard Morris (Paul Edinger kick), Pittsburgh 14–7

2nd quarter

- Iowa – (13:05) Todd Blythe 5-yard pass from Brad Banks (Piotr Czech kick), Tied 14–14
- Pittsburgh – (4:55) Joshua Rue 1-yard run (Paul Edinger kick), Pittsburgh 21–14
- Pittsburgh – (0:55) Lonnell Dewalt 21-yard pass from Bernard Morris (Paul Edinger kick), Pittsburgh 28–14

3rd quarter

- Iowa – (11:51) Todd Blythe 8-yard pass from Brad Banks (Piotr Czech kick), Pittsburgh 28–21
- Pittsburgh – (10:26) Jerome Mathis 37-yard pass from Kevin McCabe (Paul Edinger kick), Pittsburgh 35–21
- Pittsburgh – (0:39) Joshua Rue 3-yard pass from Kevin McCabe (Paul Edinger kick failed), Pittsburgh 41–21

4th quarter

- Pittsburgh – (4:55) Michael Washington 19-yard pass from Kevin McCabe (Paul Edinger kick), Pittsburgh 48–21
- Iowa – (1:59) Todd Blythe 10-yard pass from Brad Banks (Piotr Czech kick), Pittsburgh 48–28
- Pittsburgh – (0:41) Paul Edinger 32-yard field goal, Pittsburgh 51–28
- Pittsburgh – (0:24) Lonnell Dewalt 24-yard interception return (Paul Edinger kick), Pittsburgh 58–28

Passing

- Iowa – Brad Banks: 27/45, 283 yards, 4 TD, 3 INT
- Pittsburgh – Kevin McCabe: 10/14, 210 yards, 3 TD

Rushing

- Iowa – Brad Banks: 2 att, 25 yards
- Pittsburgh – Joshua Rue: 6 att, 8 yards, 2 TD

Receiving

- Iowa – Todd Blythe: 9 rec, 131 yards, 4 TD
- Pittsburgh – Jerome Mathis: 4 rec, 53 yards, 1 TD

=== Week 3: vs. Spokane Shock ===
Week 3: Spokane Shock at Iowa Barnstormers – Game summary

Quarter	1	2	3	4	Total
Shock	14	14	7	7	42
Barnstormers	12	6	19	6	43

at Wells Fargo Arena, Des Moines, Iowa

- Date: March 25
- Game time: 7:00 p.m. CDT
- Game attendance: 10,552
- Referee: Joe Pester
- Recap

Game information

1st quarter

- Iowa – (11:12) Jesse Schmidt 15-yard pass from Brad Banks (Piotr Czech kick failed), Iowa 6–0
- Spokane – (8:17) Greg Orton 6-yard pass from Kyle Rowley (Taylor Rownan kick), Spokane 7–6
- Iowa – (4:13) Brad Banks 22-yard run (Piotr Czech kick failed), Iowa 12–7
- Spokane – (2:22) Greg Orton 12-yard pass from Kyle Rowley (Taylor Rownan kick), Spokane 14–12

2nd quarter

- Spokane – (8:01) Greg Orton 28-yard pass from Kyle Rowley (Taylor Rownan kick), Spokane 21–12
- Spokane – (5:39) Shaun Kauleinamoku 8-yard pass from Kyle Rowley (Taylor Rownan kick), Spokane 28–12
- Iowa – (1:32) Brad Banks 1-yard run (Piotr Czech kick failed), Spokane 28–18

3rd quarter

- Iowa – (7:57) Todd Blythe 16-yard pass from Brad Banks (Piotr Czech kick), Spokane 28–25
- Iowa – (5:18) Todd Blythe 21-yard pass from Brad Banks (Piotr Czech kick failed), Iowa 31–28
- Iowa – (3:38) Jesse Schmidt 11-yard pass from Brad Banks (Piotr Czech kick failed), Iowa 37–28
- Spokane – (2:25) Greg Orton 38-yard pass from Kyle Rowley (Taylor Rownan kick), Iowa 37–35

4th quarter

- Iowa – (14:20) Todd Blythe 4-yard pass from Brad Banks (Piotr Czech kick failed), Iowa 43–35
- Spokane – (13:03) Greg Orton 47-yard pass from Kyle Rowley (Taylor Rownan kick), Iowa 43–42

Passing

- Spokane – Kyle Rowley: 22/33, 302 yards, 6 TD, 3 INT
- Iowa – Brad Banks: 20/32, 244 yards, 5 TD, 1 INT

Rushing

- Spokane – Kyle Rowley: 1 att, 0 yards
- Iowa – Brad Banks: 10 att, 44 yards, 2 TD

Receiving

- Spokane – Greg Orton: 9 rec, 203 yards, 5 TD
- Iowa – Jesse Schmidt: 11 rec, 157 yards, 2 TD

=== Week 4: at San Jose SaberCats ===
Week 4: Iowa Barnstormers at San Jose SaberCats – Game summary

Quarter	1	2	3	4	Total
Barnstormers	13	21	14	28	76
SaberCats	14	20	14	21	69

at HP Pavilion at San Jose, San Jose, California

- Date: April 1
- Game time: 9:30 p.m. CDT
- Game attendance: 9,163
- Referee: David Cutaia
- Recap

Game information

1st quarter

- San Jose – (13:54) Nicherin Flowers 17-yard pass from Mark Grieb (Juan Gamboa kick), San Jose 7–0
- Iowa – (10:22) Jesse Schmidt 5-yard pass from Brad Banks (Phil Marfuggi kick), Tied 7–7
- Iowa – (6:37) Todd Blythe 8-yard pass from Brad Banks (Phil Marfuggi kick failed), Iowa 13–7
- San Jose – (2:21) Nicherin Flowers 3-yard pass from Mark Grieb (Juan Gamboa kick), San Jose 14–13

2nd quarter

- Iowa – (14:12) Todd Blythe 20-yard pass from Brad Banks (Phil Marfuggi kick failed), Iowa 19–14
- San Jose – (11:30) Chad Cook 18-yard pass from Mark Grieb (Juan Gamboa kick), San Jose 21–19
- Iowa – (7:22) Jesse Schmidt 4-yard pass from Brad Banks (Brad Banks pass), Iowa 27–21
- San Jose – (4:44) Samora Goodson 23-yard pass from Mark Grieb (Juan Gamboa kick), San Jose 28–27
- Iowa – (2:48) Jesse Schmidt 9-yard pass from Brad Banks (Phil Marfuggi kick), Iowa 34–28
- San Jose – (0:02) Mark Lewis 2-yard pass from Mark Grieb (Juan Gamboa kick failed), Tied 34–34

3rd quarter

- Iowa – (14:23) Todd Blythe 11-yard pass from Brad Banks (Phil Marfuggi kick), Iowa 41–34
- San Jose – (9:46) Nicherin Flowers 16-yard pass from Mark Grieb (Juan Gamboa kick), Tied 41–41
- Iowa – (7:22) Jesse Schmidt 15-yard pass from Brad Banks (Phil Marfuggi kick), Iowa 48–41
- San Jose – (2:13) Chad Cook 4-yard run (Juan Gamboa kick), Tied 48–48

4th quarter

- Iowa – (14:22) Jesse Schmidt 18-yard pass from Brad Banks (Phil Marfuggi kick), Iowa 55–48
- San Jose – (13:15) Burt Toler 47-yard pass from Mark Grieb (Juan Gamboa kick), Tied 55–55
- Iowa – (10:05) Todd Blythe 38-yard pass from Brad Banks (Phil Marfuggi kick), Iowa 62–55
- San Jose – (9:15) Nicherin Flowers 19-yard pass from Mark Grieb (Juan Gamboa kick), Tied 62–62
- Iowa – (7:26) Jesse Schmidt 42-yard pass from Brad Banks (Phil Marfuggi kick), Iowa 69–62
- Iowa – (0:50) Brad Banks 7-yard run (Phil Marfuggi kick), Iowa 76–62
- San Jose – (0:28) Samora Goodson 8-yard pass from Mark Grieb (Juan Gamboa kick), Iowa 76–69

Passing

- Iowa – Brad Banks: 24/37, 383 yards, 10 TD
- San Jose – Mark Grieb: 33/47, 391 yards, 9 TD, 1 INT

Rushing

- Iowa – Brad Banks: 4 att, 17 yards, 1 TD
- San Jose – Chad Cook: 1 att, 4 yards, 1 TD

Receiving

- Iowa – Jesse Schmidt: 13 rec, 183 yards, 6 TD
- San Jose – Samora Goodson: 10 rec, 131 yards, 2 TD

=== Week 5: at Kansas City Command ===
Week 5: Iowa Barnstormers at Kansas City Command – Game summary

Quarter	1	2	3	4	Total
Barnstormers	0	12	6	30	48
Command	13	7	14	28	62

at Sprint Center, Kansas City, Missouri

- Date: April 9
- Game time: 7:30 p.m. CDT
- Game attendance: 5,438
- Referee: Shawn Hochuli
- Recap

Game information

1st quarter

- Kansas City – (11:58) Christian Wise 29-yard pass from J.J. Raterink (Brian Umstead kick failed), Kansas City 6–0
- Kansas City – (3:10) Bret Smith 10-yard pass from J.J. Raterink (Brian Umstead kick), Kansas City 13–0

2nd quarter

- Iowa – (14:57) Todd Blythe 5-yard pass from Brad Banks (Phil Marfuggi kick failed), Kansas City 13–6
- Kansas City – (4:58) Bradley Chavez 5-yard pass from J.J. Raterink (Brian Umstead kick), Kansas City 20–6
- Iowa – (3:20) Errick McCown 34-yard pass from Brad Banks (Phil Marfuggi kick blocked), Kansas City 20–12

3rd quarter

- Iowa – (12:14) Todd Blythe 7-yard pass from Brad Banks (Phil Marfuggi kick failed), Kansas City 20–18
- Kansas City – (7:35) Bret Smith 9-yard pass from J.J. Raterink (J.J. Raterink rush failed), Kansas City 26–18
- Kansas City – (1:34) Bradley Chavez 31-yard pass from J.J. Raterink (Steve Wasil rush), Kansas City 34–18

4th quarter

- Iowa – (12:36) Jesse Schmidt 13-yard pass from Brad Banks (Brad Banks rush), Kansas City 34–26
- Kansas City – (11:19) Bret Smith 38-yard pass from J.J. Raterink (Brian Umstead kick), Kansas City 41–26
- Iowa – (9:26) Jesse Schmidt 24-yard pass from Brad Banks (Jesse Schmidt rush), Kansas City 41–34
- Iowa – (7:40) Charles Johnson 0-yard fumble recovery (Phil Marfuggi kick), Tied 41–41
- Kansas City – (5:56) Bradley Chavez 21-yard pass from J.J. Raterink (Brian Umstead kick), Kansas City 48–41
- Kansas City – (4:36) Lee Bryant 0-yard fumble recovery (Brian Umstead kick), Kansas City 55–41
- Iowa – (2:37) Errick McCown 17-yard pass from Brad Banks (Phil Marfuggi kick), Kansas City 55–48
- Kansas City – (0:19) Victor Mann 11-yard run (Brian Umstead kick), Kansas City 62–48

Passing

- Iowa – Brad Banks: 22/35, 310 yards, 6 TD, 3 INT
- Kansas City – J.J. Raterink: 25/41, 2168 yards, 7 TD, 3 INT

Rushing

- Iowa – Brad Banks: 1 att, 9 yards
- Kansas City – Victor Mann: 5 att, 24 yards, 1 TD

Receiving

- Iowa – Jesse Schmidt: 7 rec, 113 yards, 2 TD
- Kansas City – Bret Smith: 10 rec, 122 yards, 3 TD

=== Week 6: vs. Chicago Rush ===
Week 6: Chicago Rush at Iowa Barnstormers – Game summary

Quarter	1	2	3	4	Total
Rush	7	27	7	9	50
Barnstormers	21	6	15	7	49

at Wells Fargo Arena, Des Moines, Iowa

- Date: April 16
- Game time: 7:05 p.m. CDT
- Game attendance: 9,552
- Referee: Tom McCabe
- Recap

Game information

1st quarter

- Iowa – (11:01) Jesse Schmidt 32-yard pass from Brad Banks (Phil Marfuggi kick), Iowa 7–0
- Iowa – (6:45) Jesse Schmidt 9-yard pass from Brad Banks (Phil Marfuggi kick), Iowa 14–0
- Chicago – (5:16) Charles Dillon 43-yard pass from Russ Michna (Chris Gould kick), Iowa 14–7
- Iowa – (1:32) Jesse Schmidt 4-yard pass from Brad Banks (Phil Marfuggi kick), Iowa 21–7

2nd quarter

- Chicago – (9:32) Reggie Gray 24-yard pass from Russ Michna (Chris Gould kick), Iowa 21–14
- Chicago – (3:53) Marcus Waugh 1-yard run (Chris Gould kick failed), Iowa 21–20
- Chicago – (2:44) Reggie Gray 4-yard pass from Russ Michna (Chris Gould kick), Chicago 27–21
- Iowa – (0:52) Jesse Schmidt 16-yard pass from Brad Banks (Phil Marfuggi kick failed), Tied 27–27
- Chicago – (0:15) Reggie Gray 27-yard pass from Russ Michna (Chris Gould kick), Chicago 34–27

3rd quarter

- Iowa – (11:07) Jesse Schmidt 15-yard pass from Brad Banks (Phil Marfuggi kick failed), Chicago 34–33
- Chicago – (8:10) Charles Dillon 26-yard pass from Russ Michna (Chris Gould kick), Chicago 41–33
- Iowa – (4:32) Jesse Schmidt 4-yard pass from Brad Banks (Phil Marfuggi kick), Chicago 41–40
- Iowa – (2:32) Team safety, Iowa 42–41

4th quarter

- Iowa – (8:11) Jesse Schmidt 12-yard pass from Brad Banks (Phil Marfuggi kick), Iowa 49–41
- Chicago – (5:48) Reggie Gray 12-yard pass from Russ Michna (Russ Michna pass failed), Iowa 49–47
- Chicago – (0:01) Chris Gould 18-yard field goal, Chicago 50–47

Passing

- Chicago – Russ Michna: 16/27, 243 yards, 6 TD, 2 INT
- Iowa – Brad Banks: 26/41, 271 yards, 7 TD, 1 INT

Rushing

- Chicago – Russ Michna: 3 att, 9 yards
- Iowa – Rodney Filer: 3 att, 21 yards

Receiving

- Chicago – Reggie Gray: 8 rec, 121 yards, 4 TD
- Iowa – Jesse Schmidt: 10 rec, 113 yards, 7 TD

=== Week 7: at Tulsa Talons ===
Week 7: Iowa Barnstormers at Tulsa Talons – Game summary

Quarter	1	2	3	4	Total
Barnstormers	13	14	13	20	60
Talons	21	7	14	19	61

at BOK Center, Tulsa, Oklahoma

- Date: April 23
- Game time: 7:00 p.m. CDT
- Game attendance: 5,385
- Referee: Joe Pester
- Recap

Game information

1st quarter

- Tulsa – (10:38) Troy McBroom 12-yard pass from Matt Bassuener (Juan Bongarra kick), Tulsa 7–0
- Iowa – (8:20) Todd Blythe 30-yard pass from Brad Banks (Garrett Morgan kick), Tied 7–7
- Tulsa – (6:38) Brandon Copeland 25-yard pass from Matt Bassuener (Juan Bongarra kick), Tulsa 14–7
- Iowa – (2:22) Jesse Schmidt 18-yard pass from Brad Banks (Garrett Morgan kick failed), Tulsa 14–13
- Tulsa – (1:13) Brandon Copeland 21-yard pass from Matt Bassuener (Juan Bongarra kick), Tulsa 21–13

2nd quarter

- Iowa – (10:40) Todd Blythe 5-yard pass from Brad Banks (Garrett Morgan kick), Tulsa 21–20
- Tulsa – (7:44) Troy McBroom 24-yard pass from Matt Bassuener (Juan Bongarra kick), Tulsa 28–20
- Iowa – (3:35) Todd Blythe 5-yard pass from Brad Banks (Garrett Morgan kick), Tulsa 28–27

3rd quarter

- Iowa – (12:08) Brad Banks 5-yard run (Garrett Morgan kick), Iowa 34–28
- Tulsa – (8:18) Troy McBroom 15-yard pass from Matt Bassuener (Juan Bongarra kick), Tulsa 35–34
- Iowa – (6:03) Todd Blythe 22-yard pass from Brad Banks (Garrett Morgan kick failed), Iowa 40–35
- Tulsa – (1:57) Al Hunt 2-yard run (Juan Bongarra kick), Tulsa 42–40

4th quarter

- Iowa – (14:22) Jesse Schmidt 7-yard pass from Brad Banks (Brad Banks pass failed), Iowa 46–42
- Iowa – (12:40) Jesse Schmidt 17-yard pass from Brad Banks (Garrett Morgan kick), Iowa 53–42
- Tulsa – (7:05) Matt Bassuener 1-yard run (Matt Bassuener rush), Iowa 53–50
- Iowa – (5:45) Larry Beavers 10-yard pass from Brad Banks (Garrett Morgan kick), Iowa 60–50
- Tulsa – (1:33) Matt Bassuener 1-yard run (Matt Bassuener pass), Iowa 60–58
- Tulsa – (0:00) Juan Bongarra 42-yard field goal, Tulsa 61–60

Passing

- Iowa – Mark Grieb: 24/33, 324 yards, 8 TD
- Tulsa – Matt Bassuener: 27/39, 299 yards, 5 TD, 2 INT

Rushing

- Iowa – Brad Banks: 4 att, 14 yards, 1 TD
- Tulsa – Matt Bassuener: 6 att, 51 yards, 2 TD

Receiving

- Iowa – Jesse Schmidt: 13 rec, 154 yards, 3 TD
- Tulsa – Troy McBroom: 13 rec, 144 yards, 3 TD

=== Week 8: vs. Philadelphia Soul ===
Week 8: Philadelphia Soul at Iowa Barnstormers – Game summary

Quarter	1	2	3	4	Total
Soul	14	27	14	21	76
Barnstormers	6	21	13	22	62

at Wells Fargo Arena, Des Moines, Iowa

- Date: April 30
- Game time: 7:05 p.m. CDT
- Game attendance: 8,103
- Referee: Jeff Johnson
- Recap

Game information

1st quarter

- Iowa – (13:14) Todd Blythe 23-yard pass from Brad Banks (Kyle Schlicher kick failed), Iowa 6–0
- Philadelphia – (11:14) Keith Stokes 49-yard pass from Ryan Vena (Robbie Smith kick), Philadelphia 7–6
- Philadelphia – (0:23) Keith Stokes 14-yard pass from Ryan Vena (Robbie Smith kick), Philadelphia 14–6

2nd quarter

- Philadelphia – (12:23) Darnell Whiltey 2-yard run (Robbie Smith kick), Philadelphia 21–6
- Iowa – (8:00) Errick McCown 7-yard pass from Brad Banks (Kyle Schlicher kick), Philadelphia 21–13
- Philadelphia – (5:28) Ty Nsekle 17-yard pass from Ryan Vena (Robbie Smith kick), Philadelphia 28–13
- Iowa – (2:18) Todd Blythe 16-yard pass from Brad Banks (Kyle Schlicher kick), Philadelphia 28–20
- Philadelphia – (0:32) Donovan Morgan 24-yard pass from Ryan Vena (Robbie Smith kick failed), Philadelphia 34–20
- Iowa – (0:21) Jesse Schmidt 18-yard pass from Brad Banks (Kyle Schlicher kick), Philadelphia 34–27
- Philadelphia – (0:04) Syvelle Newton 10-yard pass from Ryan Vena (Robbie Smith kick), Philadelphia 41–27

3rd quarter

- Philadelphia – (13:53) Syvelle Newton 28-yard pass from Ryan Vena (Robbie Smith kick), Philadelphia 48–27
- Philadelphia – (12:38) Tanner Varner 8-yard interception return (Robbie Smith kick), Philadelphia 55–27
- Iowa – (10:55) Errick McCown 4-yard pass from Brad Banks (Kyle Schlicher kick failed), Philadelphia 55–33
- Iowa – (0:00) Todd Blythe 13-yard pass from Brad Banks (Kyle Schlicher kick), Philadelphia 55–40

4th quarter

- Philadelphia – (11:46) Keith Stokes 13-yard pass from Ryan Vena (Robbie Smith kick), Philadelphia 62–40
- Philadelphia – (8:31) Dejuan Alfonzo 39-yard interception return (Robbie Smith kick), Philadelphia 69–40
- Iowa – (6:06) Jesse Schmidt 16-yard pass from Brad Banks (Kyle Schlicher kick), Philadelphia 69–47
- Philadelphia – (4:37) Syvelle Newton 45-yard pass from Ryan Vena (Robbie Smith kick), Philadelphia 76–47
- Iowa – (1:11) Errick McCown 5-yard pass from Brad Banks (Kyle Schlicher kick), Philadelphia 76–54
- Iowa – (0:32) Todd Blythe 10-yard pass from Brad Banks (Brad Banks pass), Philadelphia 76–62

Passing

- Philadelphia – Russ Michna: 20/30, 317 yards, 8 TD, 1 INT
- Iowa – Brad Banks: 33/43, 397 yards, 9 TD, 2 INT

Rushing

- Philadelphia – Darnell Whitley: 5 att, 10 yards, 1 TD
- Iowa – Brad Banks: 3 att, 17 yards

Receiving

- Philadelphia – Keith Stokes: 11 rec, 159 yards, 3 TD
- Iowa – Todd Blythe: 13 rec, 187 yards, 4 TD

=== Week 9: at Dallas Vigilantes ===
Week 9: Iowa Barnstormers at Dallas Vigilantes – Game summary

Quarter	1	2	3	4	Total
Barnstormers	17	20	7	13	57
Vigilantes	14	27	14	16	71

at American Airlines Center, Dallas, Texas

- Date: May 6
- Game time: 7:30 p.m. CDT
- Game attendance: 6,634
- Referee: Chris Snead
- Recap

Game information

1st quarter

- Iowa – (12:19) Kyle Schlicher 29-yard field goal, Iowa 3–0
- Dallas – (10:22) DeAndrew Rubin 14-yard pass from Dan Raudabaugh (Remy Hamilton kick), Dallas 7–3
- Iowa – (6:38) Todd Blythe 11-yard pass from Brad Banks (Kyle Schlicher kick), Iowa 10–7
- Iowa – (4:22) Pat Stoudamire 16-yard interception return (Kyle Schlicher kick), Iowa 17–7
- Dallas – (1:19) DeAndrew Rubin 29-yard pas from Dan Raudabaugh (Remy Hamilton kick), Iowa 17–14

2nd quarter

- Iowa – (9:28) Jesse Schmidt 8-yard pass from Brad Banks (Kyle Schlicher kick), Iowa 24–14
- Dallas – (8:17) DeAndrew Rubin 21-yard pass from Dan Raudabaugh (Remy Hamilton kick), Iowa 24–21
- Dallas – (4:27) Anthony Jones 8-yard pass from Dan Raudabaugh (Remy Hamilton kick failed), Dallas 27–24
- Dallas – (1:00) Anthony Jones 31-yard pass from Dan Raudabaugh (Remy Hamilton kick), Dallas 34–24
- Iowa – (00:36) Brad Banks 1-yard run (Kyle Schlicher kick), Dallas 34–31
- Iowa – (00:34) Clarence Ward 1-yard net recovery (Kyle Schlicher kick failed), Iowa 37–34
- Dallas – (00:23) Anthony Jones 9-yard pass from Dan Raudabaugh (Remy Hamilton kick), Dallas 41–37

3rd quarter

- Dallas – (13:02) Derrick Ross 1-yard run (Remy Hamilton kick), Dallas 48–37
- Iowa – (9:28) Jesse Schmidt 5-yard pass from Brad Banks (Kyle Schlicher kick), Dallas 48–44
- Dallas – (3:14) Derrick Ross 1-yard run (Remy Hamilton kick), Dallas 55–44

4th quarter

- Dallas – (9:30) Derrick Ross 6-yard run (Remy Hamilton Kick), Dallas 62–44
- Dallas – (8:01) Team safety (Iowa penalized in end zone), Dallas 64–44
- Iowa – (4:03) Todd Blythe 2-yard pass from Brad Banks (Kyle Schlicher kick failed), Dallas 64–50
- Dallas – (2:37) Anthony Jones 6-yard pass from Dan Raudabaugh (Remy Hamilton kick), Dallas 71–50
- Iowa – (1:28) Errick McCown 47-yard pass from Brad Banks (Kyle Schlicher kick), Dallas 71–57

Passing

- Dallas – Dan Raudabaugh: 18/34, 249 yards, 7 TD, 2 INT
- Iowa – Brad Banks: 19/34, 268 yards, 5 TD, 3 INT

Rushing

- Dallas – Derrick Ross: 10 att, 29 yards, 3 TD
- Iowa – Brad Banks: 8 att, 36 yards, 1 TD

Receiving

- Dallas – Anthony Jones: 7 rec, 81 yards, 4 TD
- Iowa – Jesse Schmidt: 9 rec, 91 yards, 2 TD

=== Week 10: at Jacksonville Sharks ===
Week 10: Iowa Barnstormers at Jacksonville Sharks – Game summary

Quarter	1	2	3	4	Total
Barnstormers	7	6	7	7	27
Sharks	35	21	16	7	79

at Jacksonville Veterans Memorial Arena, Jacksonville, Florida

- Date: May 13
- Game time: 7:00 p.m. CDT
- Game attendance: 9,052
- Referee: Larry Smith
- Recap

Game information

1st quarter

- Jacksonville – (13:44) Jomo Wilson 31-yard pass from Aaron Garcia (Marco Capozzoli kick), Jacksonville 7–0
- Iowa – (9:38) Jesse Schmidt 12-yard pass from Brad Banks (Nick Pertuit kick), Tied 7–7
- Jacksonville – (8:21) Sale' Key 13-yard pass from Aaron Garcia (Marco Capozzoli kick), Jacksonville 14–7
- Jacksonville – (4:13) Sale' Key 30-yard pass from Aaron Garcia (Marco Capozzoli kick), Jacksonville 21–7
- Jacksonville – (2:42) Jomo Wilson 30-yard pass from Aaron Garcia (Marco Capozzoli kick), Jacksonville 28–7
- Jacksonville – (0:30) Terrance Smith 20-yard interception return (Marco Capozzoli kick), Jacksonville 35–7

2nd quarter

- Jacksonville – (9:31) Kirby Griffin 2-yard run (Marco Capozzoli kick), Jacksonville 42–7
- Jacksonville – (7:11) Jeron Harvey 8-yard pass from Aaron Garcia (Marco Capozzoli kick), Jacksonville 49–7
- Iowa – (0:56) Jesse Schmidt 18-yard pass from Bryan Lee-Lauduski (Nick Pertuit kick failed), Jacksonville 49–13
- Jacksonville – (0:18) Jomo Wilson 16-yard pass from Aaron Garcia (Marco Capozzoli kick), Jacksonville 56–13

3rd quarter

- Jacksonville – (10:03) Ventrell Jenkins safety, Jacksonville 58–13
- Jacksonville – (7:39) Jeron Harvey 7-yard pass from Aaron Garcia (Marco Capozzoli kick), Jacksonville 65–13
- Iowa – (2:37) Todd Blythe 22-yard pass from Bryan Lee-Lauduski (Nick Pertuit kick), Jacksonville 65–20
- Jacksonville – (1:19) Jomo Wilson 41-yard pass from Omar Jacobs (Marco Capozzoli kick), Jacksonville 72–20

4th quarter

- Iowa – (12:32) Todd Blythe 3-yard pass from Bryan Lee-Lauduski (Nick Pertuit kick), Jacksonville 72–27
- Jacksonville – (9:36) Jeron Harvey 19-yard pass from Omar Jacobs (Marco Capozzoli kick), Jacksonville 79–27

Passing

- Iowa – Bryan Lee-Lauduski: 13/27, 185 yards, 3 TD, 3 INT
- Jacksonville – Aaron Garcia: 12/17, 227 yards, 7 TD, 1 INT

Rushing

- Iowa – Bryan Lee-Lauduski: 1 att, 4 yards
- Jacksonville – Kirby Griffin: 9 att, 18 yards, 1 TD

Receiving

- Iowa – Todd Blythe: 9 rec, 106 yards, 2 TD
- Jacksonville – Jomo Wilson: 5 rec, 132 yards, 4 TD

=== Week 12: vs. Utah Blaze ===
Week 12: Utah Blaze at Iowa Barnstormers – Game summary

Quarter	1	2	3	4	Total
Blaze	20	14	14	0	48
Barnstormers	13	21	9	7	50

at Wells Fargo Arena, Des Moines, Iowa

- Date: May 27
- Game time: 7:05 p.m. CDT
- Game attendance: 7,884
- Referee: Jim Corpora
- Recap

Game information

1st quarter

- Utah – (14:07) Ernest Pierce 16-yard pass from Tommy Grady (Andrew Aguila kick), Utah 7–0
- Iowa – (11:15) Jesse Schmidt 31-yard pass from Brad Banks (Nick Pertuit kick failed), Utah 7–6
- Utah – (7:40) Ernest Pierce 9-yard pass from Tommy Grady (Andrew Aguila kick), Utah 14–6
- Iowa – (4:04) Jesse Schimdt 15-yard pass from Brad Banks (Nick Pertuit kick), Utah 14–13
- Utah – (1:06) Ernest Pierce 4-yard pass from Tommy Grady (Andrew Aguila kick failed), Utah 20–13

2nd quarter

- Iowa – (11:28) Errick McCown 15-yard pass from Brad Banks (Nick Pertuit kick), Tied 20–20
- Utah – (8:00) Alvance Robinson 11-yard pass from Tommy Grady (Andrew Aguila kick), Utah 27–20
- Iowa – (4:20) Errick McCown 4-yard pass from Brad Banks (Nick Pertuit kick), Tied 27–27
- Utah – (0:48) Ernest Pierce 29-yard pass from Tommy Grady (Andrew Aguila kick), Utah 34–27
- Iowa – (0:32) Marquis Hamilton 3-yard pass from Brad Banks (Nick Pertuit kick), Tied 34–34

3rd quarter

- Iowa – (14:22) Jesse Schmidt 16-yard pass from Brad Banks (Nick Pertuit kick failed), Iowa 40–34
- Utah – (10:26) Ben Stallings 4-yard run (Andrew Aguila kick), Utah 41–40
- Iowa – (2:36) Nick Pertuit 27-yard field goal, Iowa 43–41
- Utah – (2:21) Chris Bocage 58-yard kickoff return (Andrew Aguila kick), Utah 48–43

4th quarter

- Iowa – (10:32) Tommy Ellingworth 29-yard pass from Brad Banks (Nick Pertuit kick), Iowa 50–48

Passing

- Utah – Tommy Grady: 22/40, 276 yards, 5 TD, 1 INT
- Iowa – Brad Banks: 21/31, 223 yards, 7 TD

Rushing

- Utah – Ben Stallings: 4 att, 11 yards, 1 TD
- Iowa – Brad Banks: 12 att, 42 yards

Receiving

- Utah – Ernest Pierce: 10 rec, 163 yards, 4 TD
- Iowa – Jesse Schmidt: 5 rec, 87 yards, 3 TD

=== Week 13: vs. Orlando Predators ===
Week 13: Orlando Predators at Iowa Barnstormers – Game summary

Quarter	1	2	3	4	Total
Predators	16	20	21	20	77
Barnstormers	0	20	14	27	61

at Wells Fargo Arena, Des Moines, Iowa

- Date: June 4
- Game time: 7:05 p.m. CDT
- Game attendance: 8,279
- Referee: Shane Anderson
- Recap

Game information

1st quarter

- Orlando – (9:08) Team safety, Orlando 2–0
- Orlando – (7:25) Josh Bush 3-yard run (Mark Lewis kick), Orlando 9–0
- Orlando – (0:18) Bobby Sippio 19-yard pass from Nick Hill (Mark Lewis kick), Orlando 16–0

2nd quarter

- Iowa – (13:06) Team safety, Orlando 16–2
- Iowa – (12:05) Marquis Hamilton 14-yard pass from Brad Banks (Nick Pertuit kick blocked), Orlando 16–8
- Orlando – (8:12) Bobby Sippio 10-yard pass from Nick Hill (Mark Lewis kick failed), Orlando 22–8
- Orlando – (4:04) Bobby Sippio 7-yard pass from Nick Hill (Mark Lewis kick), Orlando 29–8
- Orlando – (2:24) Andy Dorcely 0-yard net recovery (Mark Lewis kick), Orlando 36–8
- Iowa – (0:39) Brad Banks 2-yard run (Nick Pertuit kick failed), Orlando 36–14
- Iowa – (0:00) Jesse Schmidt 12-yard pass from Brad Banks (Brad Banks pass failed), Orlando 36–20

3rd quarter

- Orlando – (12:25) T.T. Toliver 16-yard pass from Nick Hill (Mark Lewis kick), Orlando 43–20
- Iowa – (11:04) Rodney Filer 35-yard run (Nick Pertuit kick), Orlando 43–27
- Orlando – (9:21) Bobby Sippio 6-yard pass from Nick Hill (Mark Lewis kick), Orlando 50–27
- Orlando – (4:46) Bobby Sippio 45-yard pass from Nick Hill (Mark Lewis kick), Orlando 57–27
- Iowa – (3:44) Cameron McGlenn 47-yard kickoff return (Nick Pertuit kick), Orlando 57–34

4th quarter

- Orlando – (12:18) Bobby Sippio 11-yard pass from Nick Hill (Mark Lewis kick failed), Orlando 63–34
- Iowa – (11:00) Jesse Schmidt 40-yard pass from Bryan Lee-Lauduski (Nick Pertuit kick), Orlando 63–41
- Iowa – (7:43) Jesse Schmidt 3-yard pass from Bryan Lee-Lauduski (Nick Pertuit kick), Orlando 63–48
- Orlando – (4:06) Josh Bush 17-yard pass from Nick Hill (Mark Lewis kick), Orlando 70–48
- Iowa – (0:57) Marquis Hamilton 4-yard pass from Bryan Lee-Lauduski (Bryan Lee-Lauduski pass failed), Orlando 70–54
- Orlando – (0:14) Rayshaun Kizer 30-yard interception return (Mark Lewis kick), Orlando 77–54
- Iowa – (0:03) Tommy Ellingworth 36-yard pass from Bryan Lee-Lauduski (Nick Pertuit kick), Orlando 77–61

Passing

- Orlando – Nick Hill: 24/34, 295 yards, 8 TD, 1 INT
- Iowa – Brian Banks: 13/25, 142 yards, 2 TD, 4 INT

Rushing

- Orlando – Nick Hill: 6 att, 56 yards
- Iowa – Rodney Filer: 2 att, 36 yards, 1 TD

Receiving

- Orlando – Bobby Sippio: 9 rec, 124 yards, 6 TD
- Iowa – Jesse Schmidt: 7 rec, 114 yards, 3 TD

=== Week 14: at Arizona Rattlers ===
Week 14: Iowa Barnstormers at Arizona Rattlers – Game summary

Quarter	1	2	3	4	Total
Barnstormers	6	14	14	7	41
Rattlers	21	14	13	13	61

at US Airways Center, Phoenix, Arizona

- Date: June 11
- Game time: 7:05 p.m. CDT
- Game attendance: 8,664
- Referee: Chris Snead
- Recap

Game information

1st quarter

- Arizona – (8:00) Odie Armstrong 7-yard run (Fabrizio Scaccia kick), Arizona 7–0
- Iowa – (6:13) Jesse Schmidt 4-yard pass from Brad Banks (Nick Pertuit kick failed), Arizona 7–6
- Arizona – (5:21) Virgil Gray 54-yard kickoff return (Fabrizio Scaccia kick), Arizona 14–6
- Arizona – (2:09) Glen Fox 13-yard pass from Nick Davila (Fabrizio Scaccia kick), Arizona 21–6

2nd quarter

- Iowa – (11:06) Marquis Hamilton 3-yard pass from Brad Banks (Nick Pertuit kick), Arizona 21–13
- Arizona – (0:56) Rod Windsor 5-yard pass from Nick Davila (Fabrizio Scaccia kick), Arizona 28–13
- Iowa – (0:45) Marquis Hamilton 3-yard pass from Brad Banks (Nick Pertuit kick), Arizona 28–20
- Arizona – (0:09) Kerry Reed 9-yard pass from Nick Davila (Fabrizio Scaccia kick), Arizona 35–20

3rd quarter

- Arizona – (14:29) Odie Armstrong 15-yard pass from Nick Davila (Fabrizio Scaccia kick), Arizona 42–20
- Iowa – (8:30) Marquis Hamilton 7-yard pass from Bryan Lee-Lauduski (Nick Pertuit kick), Arizona 42–27
- Iowa – (2:42) Jesse Schmidt 3-yard pass from Bryan Lee-Lauduski (Nick Pertuit kick), Arizona 42–34
- Arizona – (0:00) Jason Geathers 8-yard pass from Nick Davila (Fabrizio Scaccia kick failed), Arizona 48–34

4th quarter

- Arizona – (12:35) Jason Geathers 14-yard pass from Nick Davila (Fabrizio Scaccia kick failed), Arizona 54–34
- Iowa – (10:45) Jesse Schmidt 41-yard pass from Bryan Lee-Lauduski (Nick Pertuit kick), Arizona 54–41
- Arizona – (7:47) Rod Windsor 13-yard pass from Nick Davila (Fabrizio Scaccia kick), Arizona 61–41

Passing

- Iowa – Bryan Lee-Lauduski: 17/27, 148 yards, 3 TD, 1 INT
- Arizona – Nick Davila: 20/28, 268 yards, 7 TD, 1 INT

Rushing

- Iowa – Brad Banks: 4 att, 19 yards
- Arizona – Odie Armstrong: 4 att, 21 yards, 1 TD

Receiving

- Iowa – Jesse Schmidt: 11 rec, 123 yards, 3 TD
- Arizona – Rod Windsor: 9 rec, 119 yards, 2 TD

=== Week 15: vs. Dallas Vigilantes ===
Week 15: Dallas Vigilantes at Iowa Barnstormers – Game summary

Quarter	1	2	3	4	Total
Vigilantes	20	14	7	24	65
Barnstormers	7	13	15	20	55

at Wells Fargo Arena, Des Moines, Iowa

- Date: June 18
- Game time: 7:05 p.m. CDT
- Game attendance: 8,059
- Referee: Larry Smith
- Recap

Game information

1st quarter

- Dallas – (14:19) DeAndrew Rubin 44-yard pass from Dan Raudabaugh (Remy Hamilton kick failed), Dallas 6–0
- Dallas – (7:38) DeAndrew Rubin 13-yard pass from Dan Raudabaugh (Remy Hamilton kick), Dallas 13–0
- Iowa – (6:22) Todd Blythe 36-yard pass from Brad Banks (Nick Pertuit kick), Dallas 13–7
- Dallas – (0:00) Anthony Jones 11-yard pass from Dan Raudabaugh (Remy Hamilton kick), Dallas 20–7

2nd quarter

- Iowa – (11:48) Brad Banks 1-yard run (Nick Pertuit kick failed), Dallas 20–13
- Dallas – (8:53) Matt Fields 28-yard pass from Dan Raudabaugh (Remy Hamilton kick), Dallas 27–13
- Dallas – (0:26) Anthony Jones 10-yard pass from Dan Raudabaugh (Remy Hamilton kick), Dallas 34–13
- Iowa – (0:03) Todd Blythe 22-yard pass from Brad Banks (Nick Pertuit kick), Dallas 34–20

3rd quarter

- Iowa – (10:46) Marquis Hamilton 5-yard pass from Brad Banks (Nick Pertuit kick), Dallas 34–27
- Iowa – (9:33) Team safety, Dallas 34–29
- Iowa – (3:06) Brad Banks 1-yard run (Nick Pertuit kick failed), Iowa 35–34
- Dallas – (0:46) Derrick Ross 9-yard run (Remy Hamilton kick), Dallas 41–35

4th quarter

- Dallas – (14:05) Derrick Ross 10-yard run (Remy Hamilton kick), Dallas 48–35
- Dallas – (12:47) Anthony Jones 12-yard pass from Dan Raudabaugh (Remy Hamilton kick), Dallas 55–35
- Iowa – (11:13) Jesse Schmidt 16-yard pass from Brad Banks (Nick Pertuit kick), Dallas 55–42
- Dallas – (7:52) Remy Hamilton 24-yard field goal, Dallas 58–42
- Iowa – (5:46) Rodney Filer 1-yard run (Brad Banks pass failed), Dallas 58–48
- Dallas – (4:40) Mike Aguayo 13-yard pass from Dan Raudabaugh (Remy Hamilton kick), Dallas 65–48
- Iowa – (1:51) Jesse Schmidt 10-yard pass from Brad Banks (Nick Pertuit kick), Dallas 65–55

Passing

- Dallas – Dan Raudabaugh: 16/26, 254 yards, 7 TD
- Iowa – Russ Michna: 24/36, 363 yards, 5 TD, 1 INT

Rushing

- Dallas – Derrick Ross: 13 att, 67 yards, 2 TD
- Iowa – Brad Banks: 6 att, 9 yards, 2 TD

Receiving

- Dallas – DeAndrew Rubin: 4 rec, 106 yards, 2 TD
- Iowa – Jesse Schmidt: 10 rec, 150 yards, 2 TD

=== Week 16: at Chicago Rush ===
Week 16: Iowa Barnstormers at Chicago Rush – Game summary

Quarter	1	2	3	4	Total
Barnstormers	27	0	0	21	48
Rush	7	20	13	18	58

at Allstate Arena, Rosemont, Illinois

- Date: June 26
- Game time: 3:00 p.m. CDT
- Game attendance: 9,063
- Referee: Alex Kemp
- Recap

Game information

1st quarter

- Iowa – (13:58) Jesse Schmidt 5-yard pass from Bryan Lee-Lauduski (Nick Pertuit kick), Iowa 7–0
- Chicago – (11:57) Charles Dillon 23-yard pass from Dominic Randolph (Rob Forstrom kick), Tied 7–7
- Iowa – (10:09) Jesse Schmidt 18-yard pass from Bryan Lee-Lauduski (Nick Pertuit kick failed), Iowa 13–7
- Iowa – (4:31) Rodney Filer 5-yard run (Nick Pertuit kick), Iowa 20–7
- Iowa – (1:48) Jesse Schmidt 3-yard pass from Bryan Lee-Lauduski (Nick Pertuit kick), Iowa 27–7

2nd quarter

- Chicago – (14:15) Reggie Gray 25-yard pass from Dominic Randolph (Rob Forstrom kick), Iowa 27–14
- Chicago – (6:23) Johnie Kirton 2-yard run (Rob Forstrom kick), Iowa 27–21
- Chicago – (0:46) Charles Dillon 9-yard pass from Dominic Randolph (Rob Forstrom kick failed), Tied 27–27

3rd quarter

- Chicago – (8:19) Johnie Kirton 3-yard run (Rob Forstrom kick), Chicago 34–27
- Chicago – (1:24) Reggie Gray 13-yard pass from Dominic Randolph (J.J. Raterink pass failed), Chicago 40–27

4th quarter

- Iowa – (14:52) Errick McCown 29-yard pass from Bryan Lee-Lauduski (Nick Pertuit kick), Chicago 40–34
- Iowa – (11:48) Errick McCown 12-yard pass from Bryan Lee-Lauduski (Nick Pertuit kick), Iowa 41–40
- Chicago – (11:03) Reggie Gray 57-yard kickoff return (Dominic Randolph pass), Chicago 48–41
- Iowa – (7:09) Marquis Hamilton 18-yard pass from Bryan Lee-Lauduski (Nick Pertuit kick), Tied 48–48
- Chicago – (6:17) Reggie Gray 55-yard kickoff return (Rob Forstrom kick), Chicago 55–48
- Chicago – (2:05) Rob Forstrom 29-yard field goal, Chicago 58–48

Passing

- Iowa – Bryan Lee-Lauduski: 33/48, 355 yards, 6 TD, 3 INT
- Chicago – Dominic Randolph: 17/27, 189 yards, 4 TD, 1 INT

Rushing

- Iowa – Rodney Filer: 3 att, 8 yards, 1 TD
- Chicago – Johnie Kirton: 8 att, 28 yards, 2 TD

Receiving

- Iowa – Marquis Hamilton: 11 rec, 122 yards, 1 TD
- Chicago – Charles Dillon: 10 rec, 104 yards, 2 TD

=== Week 17: vs. Tulsa Talons ===
Week 17: Tulsa Talons at Iowa Barnstormers – Game summary

Quarter	1	2	3	4	Total
Talons	13	19	14	7	53
Barnstormers	14	16	14	11	55

at Wells Fargo Arena, Des Moines, Iowa

- Date: July 1
- Game time: 7:05 p.m. CDT
- Game attendance: 8,156
- Referee: Tony Canella
- Recap

Game information

1st quarter

- Tulsa – (9:59) Bobby Reid 3-yard run (Juan Bongarra kick failed), Tulsa 6–0
- Iowa – (7:43) Jesse Schmidt 7-yard pass from Brad Banks (Nick Pertuit kick), Iowa 7–6
- Tulsa – (3:47) Troy McBroom 13-yard pass from Justin Allgood (Juan Bongarra kick), Tulsa 13–7
- Iowa – (1:06) Jesse Schmidt 8-yard pass from Brad Banks (Nick Pertuit kick), Iowa 14–13

2nd quarter

- Tulsa – (13:17) Al Hunt 3-yard run (Al Hunt rush failed), Tulsa 19–14
- Tulsa – (7:12) Brandon Copeland 10-yard pass from Justin Allgood (Juan Bongarra kick), Tulsa 26–14
- Iowa – (1:18) Jesse Schmidt 8-yard pass from Brad Banks (Nick Pertuit kick), Tulsa 26–21
- Iowa – (0:55) Team safety, Tulsa 26–23
- Iowa – (0:48) Marquis Hamilton 5-yard pass from Brad Banks (Nick Pertuit kick), Iowa 30–26
- Tulsa – (0:19) Troy McBroom 20-yard pass from Justin Allgood (Juan Bongarra kick failed), Tulsa 32–30

3rd quarter

- Tulsa – (11:48) Al Hunt 8-yard pass from Justin Allgood (Juan Bongarra kick), Tulsa 39–30
- Iowa – (10:41) Jesse Schmidt 35-yard pass from Brad Banks (Nick Pertuit kick), Tulsa 39–37
- Tulsa – (7:46) J.J. Payne 4-yard run (Juan Bongarra kick), Tulsa 46–37
- Iowa – (1:07) Brad Banks 1-yard run (Nick Pertuit kick), Tulsa 46–44

4th quarter

- Tulsa – (10:06) Al Hunt 14-yard pass from Justin Allgood (Juan Bongarra kick), Tulsa 53–44
- Iowa – (6:05) Marquis Hamilton 7-yard pass from Brad Banks (Brad Banks pass), Tulsa 53–52
- Iowa – (0:47) Nick Pertuit 20-yard field goal, Iowa 55–53

Passing

- Tulsa – Justin Allgood: 26/42, 241 yards, 5 TD
- Iowa – Brad Banks: 23/37, 264 yards, 6 TD

Rushing

- Tulsa – J.J. Payne: 5 att, 46 yards, 1 TD
- Iowa – Brad Banks: 5 att, 4 yards, 1 TD

Receiving

- Tulsa – Troy McBroom: 9 rec, 101 yards, 2 TD
- Iowa – Jesse Schmidt: 10 rec, 150 yards, 4 TD

=== Week 18: vs. Kansas City Command ===
Week 18: Kansas City Command at Iowa Barnstormers – Game summary

Quarter	1	2	3	4	Total
Command	6	13	7	14	40
Barnstormers	7	21	14	6	48

at Wells Fargo Arena, Des Moines, Iowa

- Date: July 9
- Game time: 7:05 p.m. CDT
- Game attendance: 8,347
- Referee: Alex Kemp
- Recap

Game information

1st quarter

- Kansas City – (4:49) Robert Gill 18-yard pass from Steve Wasil (Brian Umstead kick failed), Kansas City 6–0
- Iowa – (2:56) Jesse Schmidt 14-yard pass from Brad Banks (Nick Pertuit kick), Iowa 7–6

2nd quarter

- Kansas City – (14:55) Steven Savoy 3-yard run (Brian Umstead kick), Kansas City 13–7
- Iowa – (10:10) Jesse Schmidt 6-yard pass from Brad Banks (Nick Pertuit kick), Iowa 14–13
- Iowa – (7:48) Brad Banks 2-yard run (Nick Pertuit kick), Iowa 21–13
- Kansas City – (4:39) Bret Smith 29-yard pass from Steve Wasil (Brian Umstead kick failed), Iowa 21–19
- Iowa – (0:14) Brad Banks 2-yard run (Nick Pertuit kick), Iowa 28–19

3rd quarter

- Iowa – (13:51) Jesse Schmidt 15-yard pass from Brad Banks (Nick Pertuit kick), Iowa 35–19
- Kansas City – (9:33) Steve Wasil 1-yard run (Brian Umstead kick), Iowa 35–26
- Iowa – (5:36) Marquis Hamilton 8-yard pass from Brad Banks (Nick Pertuit kick), Iowa 42–26

4th quarter

- Kansas City – (8:46) Steven Savoy 4-yard pass from Steve Wasil (Steve Wasil pass), Iowa 42–34
- Iowa – (3:47) Nick Pertuit 18-yard field goal, Iowa 45–34
- Kansas City – (2:06) Steven Savoy 13-yard pass from Steve Wasil (Steve Wasil pass failed), Iowa 45–40
- Iowa – (0:46) Nick Pertuit 23-yard field goal, Iowa 48–40

Passing

- Kansas City – Steve Wasil: 21/38, 255 yards, 4 TD, 2 INT
- Iowa – Brad Banks: 23/41, 291 yards, 4 TD, 2 INT

Rushing

- Kansas City – Trey Bryant: 1 att, 20 yards
- Iowa – Marquis Hamilton: 1 att, 25 yards

Receiving

- Kansas City – Bret Smith: 12 rec, 156 yards, 1 TD
- Iowa – Jesse Schmidt: 9 rec, 111 yards, 3 TD

=== Week 19: at Milwaukee Mustangs ===
Week 19: Iowa Barnstormers at Milwaukee Mustangs – Game summary

Quarter	1	2	3	4	Total
Barnstormers	14	21	7	7	49
Mustangs	13	16	13	41	83

at Bradley Center, Milwaukee, Wisconsin

- Date: July 15
- Game time: 7:00 p.m. CDT
- Game attendance: 5,077
- Referee: Tony Cannella
- Recap

Game information

1st quarter

- Milwaukee – (11:54) Ernest Smith 21-yard pass from Gino Guidugli (Garrett Lindholm kick failed), Milwaukee 6–0
- Iowa – (9:18) Jesse Schmidt 9-yard pass from Bryan Lee-Laudusky (Nick Pertuit kick), Iowa 7–6
- Milwaukee – (3:06) Brandon LeFall 40-yard run (Garrett Lindholm kick), Milwaukee 13–7
- Iowa – (0:50) Everett Roberts 14-yard pass from Bryan Lee-Laudusky (Nick Pertuit kick), Iowa 14–13

2nd quarter

- Milwaukee – (13:14) Dwayne Eley Jr. 10-yard pass from Gino Guidugli (Garrett Lindholm kick), Milwaukee 20–14
- Iowa – (11:59) Jesse Schmidt 11-yard pass from Bryan Lee-Laudusky (Nick Pertuit kick), Iowa 21–20
- Iowa – (5:02) Brian Villanueva 1-yard run (Nick Pertuit kick), Iowa 28–20
- Milwaukee – (2:34) Mykel Benson 3-yard run (Garrett Lindholm kick blocked), Iowa 28–26
- Iowa – (0:12) Errick McCown 12-yard pass from Bryan Lee-Laudusky (Nick Pertuit kick), Iowa 35–26
- Milwaukee – (0:00) Garrett Lindholm 34-yard field goal, Iowa 35–29

3rd quarter

- Milwaukee – (11:09) Victor Williams 18-yard pass from Gino Guidugli (Gino Guidugli pass failed), Tied 35–35
- Milwaukee – (4:45) Victor Williams 31-yard pass from Gino Guidugli (Garrett Lindholm kick), Milwaukee 42–35
- Iowa – (2:23) Rodney Filer 4-yard run (Nick Pertuit kick), Tied 42–42

4th quarter

- Milwaukee – (13:50) Mykel Benson 4-yard run (Garrett Lindholm kick), Milwaukee 49–42
- Milwaukee – (12:51) Marcus Everett 3-yard fumble return (Garrett Lindholm kick), Milwaukee 56–42
- Iowa – (11:13) Jesse Schmidt 8-yard pass from Bryan Lee-Laudusky (Nick Pertuit kick), Milwaukee 56–49
- Milwaukee – (7:46) Ernest Smith 22-yard pass from Gino Guidugli (Garrett Lindholm kick), Milwaukee 63–49
- Milwaukee – (2:01) Ernest Smith 24-yard pass from Gino Guidugli (Garrett Lindholm kick), Milwaukee 70–49
- Milwaukee – (0:51) Marcus Everett 4-yard interception return (Garrett Lindholm kick), Milwaukee 77–49
- Milwaukee – (0:44) Justin Lawrence 10-yard interception return (Gino Guidugli pass failed), Milwaukee 83–49

Passing

- Iowa – Bryan Lee-Laudusky: 22/36, 255 yards, 5 TD, 3 INT
- Milwaukee – Gino Guidugli: 22/31, 278 yards, 6 TD

Rushing

- Iowa – Rodney Filer: 5 att, 31 yards, 1 TD
- Milwaukee – Dwayne LeFall: 1 att, 40 yards, 1 TD

Receiving

- Iowa – Jesse Schmidt: 12 rec, 147 yards, 3 TD
- Milwaukee – Ernest Smith: 6 rec, 113 yards, 3 TD

=== Week 20: vs. Georgia Force ===
Week 20: Georgia Force at Iowa Barnstormers – Game summary

Quarter	1	2	3	4	Total
Force	21	14	7	21	63
Barnstormers	13	23	13	10	59

at Wells Fargo Arena, Des Moines, Iowa

- Date: July 23
- Game time: 7:05 p.m. CDT
- Game attendance: 10,871
- Referee: Joe Pester
- Recap

Game information

1st quarter

- Georgia – (12:48) C.J. Johnson 28-yard pass from Darnell Kennedy (Carlos Martinez kick), Georgia 7–0
- Iowa – (10:02) Bryan Lee-Laudusky 1-yard run (Nick Pertuit kick), Tied 7–7
- Georgia – (8:10) Darnell Kennedy 9-yard run (Carlos Martinez kick), Georgia 14–7
- Georgia – (2:25) Larry Shipp 6-yard pass from Darnell Kennedy (Carlos Martinez kick), Georgia 21–7
- Iowa – (0:21) Jesse Schmidt 17-yard pass from Bryan Lee-Laudusky (Nick Pertuit kick failed), Georgia 21–13

2nd quarter

- Georgia – (13:43) Maurice Purify 33-yard pass from Darnell Kennedy (Carlos Martinez kick), Georgia 28–13
- Iowa – (9:28) Marquis Hamilton 14-yard pass from Bryan Lee-Laudusky (Nick Pertuit kick), Georgia 28–20
- Iowa – (4:36) Jesse Schmidt 32-yard pass from Bryan Lee-Laudusky (Nick Pertuit kick failed), Georgia 28–26
- Iowa – (3:35) Travon Johnson 0-yard net recovery (Nick Pertuit kick), Iowa 33–28
- Georgia – (2:18) Larry Shipp 44-yard pass from Darnell Kennedy (Carlos Martinez kick), Georgia 35–33
- Iowa – (0:00) Nick Pertuit 18-yard field goal, Iowa 36–35

3rd quarter

- Iowa – (8:39) Jesse Schmidt 5-yard pass from Brian Villanueva (Team rush failed), Iowa 42–35
- Georgia – (4:53) Larry Shipp 14-yard pass from Darnell Kennedy (Carlos Martinez kick), Tied 42–42
- Iowa – (1:46) Jesse Schmidt 4-yard pass from Brian Villanueva (Nick Pertuit kick), Iowa 49–42

4th quarter

- Georgia – (14:21) Maurice Purify 40-yard pass from Darnell Kennedy (Carlos Martinez kick), Tied 49–49
- Iowa – (9:08) Nick Pertuit 37-yard field goal, Iowa 52–49
- Georgia – (5:44) Maurice Purify 9-yard pass from Darnell Kennedy (Carlos Martinez kick), Georgia 56–52
- Iowa – (2:40) Jesse Schmidt 30-yard pass from Brian Villanueva (Nick Pertuit kick), Iowa 59–56
- Georgia – (0:25) Benji McDowell 1-yard run (Carlos Martinez kick), Georgia 63–59

Passing

- Georgia – Darnell Kennedy: 21/32, 373 yards, 7 TD, 1 INT
- Iowa – Bryan Lee-Laudusky: 14/18, 206 yards, 3 TD, 1 INT

Rushing

- Georgia – Darnell Kennedy: 1 att, 9 yards, 1 TD
- Iowa – Bryan Lee-Laudusky: 3 att, 6 yards, 1 TD

Receiving

- Georgia – Larry Shipp: 8 rec, 152 yards, 3 TD
- Iowa – Jesse Schmidt: 12 rec, 170 yards, 5 TD
