= Troy McBroom =

American football player (born 1983)

No. 88
- Position: Wide receiver

Personal information
- Born: February 12, 1983 (age 43); Los Angeles, California
- Listed height: 6 ft 4 in (1.93 m)
- Listed weight: 225 lb (102 kg)

Career information
- High school: Manteca (CA)
- College: St. Mary's (CA)
- NFL draft: 2006: undrafted

Career history
- Stockton Lightning (2008–2009); Tulsa Talons (2011); Chicago Rush (2012)*; Philadelphia Soul (2012)
- * Offseason or practice squad member only

Awards and highlights
- All KCAC (2004-2006); Arena Football League Rookie of the Year Nominee (2011); AFL Average Receptions Per Game Leader (2011); Talons Single Season Record for Receptions (2011)

Career AFL statistics
- Receptions: 149
- Receiving Yards: 1,747
- Receiving Touchdowns: 31

Troy Lonnell McBroom (born February 12, 1983) is an American former football wide receiver who played in the Arena Football League. In college, he was selected first team all KCAC from 2004 to 2006. McBroom played for the AF1 Tulsa Talons where he recorded 149 receptions for 1,747 yards and 31 touchdowns.

== Early years & college career ==
Troy was a three-sport athlete lettering in basketball, football and track at Manteca High School in Manteca, California. He was selected as a First Team All-Valley Oak League, all-area, all-district, and 2nd Team CIF All-State in his senior year where he played wide receiver and defensive back. He set 4 records at the school including: most single game receiving yards (230), most single game receiving touchdowns (3), most single season receiving yards (1,124), and longest touchdown reception (99 yards).

McBroom attended St. Mary's from 2001 to 2002. He then attended two seasons at Delta College, and two final years at McPherson College, an NAIA institution in Kansas, earning a degree in Physical Education & Sports Medicine in 2006. During his Senior season at McPherson, Troy had 659 receiving yards (3rd in Conference) and 6 touchdowns (2nd). He interviewed with the Cleveland Browns and Tennessee Titans but went undrafted in the 2006 NFL draft.

== Professional career ==
Eventually McBroom ended up on the radar of the Arena Football League. He signed with the Stockton Lightning of the AF2. In his rookie year (2008), he appeared in the final four games of the regular season with the Lightning. Head Coach Chad Carlson liked Troy's size and work ethic. In his debut McBroom had 10 catches for 110 yards and 4 touchdowns against the Tennessee Valley Vipers. He'd finish 2008, tallying 30 receptions for 296 yards and eight touchdowns, while averaging 74.0 yards per game.

In 2009, McBroom led the Lightning offense with 114 receptions for 1463 yards and 24 touchdowns, averaging 91.4 yards per game. He ended the regular season ranked 15th in the af2 in receiving yards per game, 10th in receptions, and 6th in reception yards.

With the Lightning suspending operations for the 2010 season, McBroom joined the Tulsa Talons of the AF1 in 2011. He earned nominations for Offensive Rookie of the Year, with 149 receptions (4th), for 1,747 yards (4th), and 31 touchdowns. His 9.9 receptions per game led the league. A separated shoulder in the final contest of 2011 ended his season prematurely as Troy had already set the Talons single season record for receptions, and posted 2nd highest single season receiving yard total in franchise history. Troy also had been invited to camp with the New York Jets, but was unable to attend due to his injury.

In 2012, McBroom was assigned to the Chicago Rush, and finished the season on the roster of the Philadelphia Soul.
