= 2011 Dallas Vigilantes season =

Arena Football League team season

- Head coach: Clint Dolezel
- Home stadium: American Airlines Center

Results
- Record: 11–7
- Division place: 2nd NC Central
- Playoffs: Lost Conference Semifinals 51–54 (Rush)

The 2011 Dallas Vigilantes season was the second season for the franchise in the Arena Football League. The team was coached by Clint Dolezel and played their home games at the American Airlines Center. The Vigilantes finished the regular season 11–7, qualifying for the playoffs for the first time in franchise history. As the 3rd seed in the National Conference, they lost to the Chicago Rush in the conference semifinals, 51–54.

== Final roster ==
2011 Dallas Vigilantes roster
| Quarterbacks: 14 Luke Drone; 5 Dan Raudabaugh; Fullbacks: 4 Derrick Ross; Wide receivers: 8 John Ferguson; 82 Matt Fields; 2 Tiger Jones; 1 DeAndrew Rubin | Offensive linemen: 54 Mike Aguoyo; 49 Zipp Duncan; 60 Christian Johnson; -- Michael Jones; 75 Brett Rayl; 52 Greg Ryan; Defensive linemen: 11 Dusty Bear; 78 Larry Brown; 78 Larry Harrison; 89 Kelvin Kinney; 10 Justin Warren; -- Rodrique Wright | Linebackers: 12 Joe Goosby; 23 Brendan Pahulu; 24 Steve Watson; Defensive backs: 6 Chris Brown; 26 Jason Harmon; 7 Keon Perry; 15 Talib Wise; Kickers: 9 Remy Hamilton | Injured Reserve: 44 Larry Dibbles DL; 3 R. J. Jackson WR; 12 Chris LeFlore DB; -- James McCoy DB; Other League Exempt: 78 Tony Washington OL; -- Jerron Wishom DB; rookies in italics Roster updated July 27, 2011; 27 Active, 6 Inactive → More rosters |

== Standings ==
Central Division
| Team | W | L | PCT | PF | PA | DIV | CON | Home | Away |
| y-Chicago Rush | 13 | 5 | .722 | 957 | 833 | 6–2 | 9–3 | 7–2 | 6–3 |
| x-Dallas Vigilantes | 11 | 7 | .611 | 1061 | 1007 | 6–2 | 7–5 | 6–3 | 5–4 |
| Tulsa Talons | 8 | 10 | .444 | 894 | 899 | 3–5 | 4–7 | 4–5 | 4–5 |
| Kansas City Command | 6 | 12 | .333 | 854 | 974 | 3–5 | 4–9 | 4–4 | 2–7 |
| Iowa Barnstormers | 5 | 13 | .278 | 916 | 1116 | 2–6 | 5–7 | 4–5 | 1–8 |

y - Clinched division
x - Clinched playoff berth

== Schedule ==
=== Regular season ===
The Vigilantes began the season at home against the Kansas City Command on March 12. Their final game of the regular season was on July 23, when they hosted the Arizona Rattlers.

| Week | Day | Date | Kickoff | Opponent | Results | | Location | Report |
| Week | Day | Date | Kickoff | Opponent | Score | Record | Location | Report |
|---|---|---|---|---|---|---|---|---|
| 1 | Saturday | March 12 | Noon CST | Kansas City Command | W 53–46 | 1–0 | American Airlines Center | |
| 2 | Saturday | March 19 | Noon CDT | Tulsa Talons | W 64–40 | 2–0 | American Airlines Center | |
| 3 | Bye | | | | | | | |
| 4 | Thursday | March 21 | 6:00 p.m. CDT | at Utah Blaze | L 40–69 | 2–1 | EnergySolutions Arena | |
| 5 | Friday | April 8 | 7:00 p.m. CDT | at Georgia Force | L 48–55 | 2–2 | Arena at Gwinnett Center | |
| 6 | Friday | April 15 | 7:30 p.m. CDT | Milwaukee Mustangs | W 49–21 | 3–2 | American Airlines Center | |
| 7 | Saturday | April 23 | 6:30 p.m. CDT | at Tampa Bay Storm | W 67–61 | 4–2 | St. Pete Times Forum | |
| 8 | Friday | April 29 | 7:30 p.m. CDT | at Kansas City Command | W 72–63 | 5–2 | Sprint Center | |
| 9 | Saturday | May 7 | 7:30 p.m. CDT | Iowa Barnstormers | W 71–57 | 6–2 | American Airlines Center | |
| 10 | Saturday | May 14 | 9:00 p.m. CDT | at Spokane Shock | L 49–71 | 6–3 | Spokane Veterans Memorial Arena | |
| 11 | Sunday | May 22 | 3:00 p.m. CDT | at Chicago Rush | L 57–69 | 6–4 | Allstate Arena | |
| 12 | Saturday | May 28 | 7:30 p.m. CDT | Pittsburgh Power | L 75–76 | 6–5 | American Airlines Center | |
| 13 | Saturday | June 4 | 7:30 p.m. CDT | San Jose SaberCats | W 70–57 | 7–5 | American Airlines Center | |
| 14 | Bye | | | | | | | |
| 15 | Saturday | June 18 | 7:05 p.m. CDT | at Iowa Barnstormers | W 65–55 | 8–5 | Wells Fargo Arena | |
| 16 | Saturday | June 25 | 7:00 p.m. CDT | at Tulsa Talons | W 55–48 | 9–5 | BOK Center | |
| 17 | Saturday | July 2 | 7:30 p.m. CDT | Philadelphia Soul | W 58–41 | 10–5 | American Airlines Center | |
| 18 | Saturday | July 9 | 6:00 p.m. CDT | at Jacksonville Sharks | W 75–70 | 11–5 | Jacksonville Veterans Memorial Arena | |
| 19 | Saturday | July 16 | 7:30 p.m. CDT | Chicago Rush | L 44–53 | 11–6 | American Airlines Center | |
| 20 | Saturday | July 23 | 7:30 p.m. CDT | Arizona Rattlers | L 49–55 | 11–7 | American Airlines Center | |

=== Playoffs ===
| Round | Day | Date | Kickoff | Opponent | Results | Location | Report |
|---|---|---|---|---|---|---|---|
| NC Semifinals | Friday | July 29 | 7:30 p.m. CDT | at Chicago Rush | L 51–54 | Allstate Arena | |

== Regular season ==
=== Week 1: vs. Kansas City Command ===
Week 1: Kansas City Command at Dallas Vigilantes – Game summary

| Quarter | 1 | 2 | 3 | 4 | Total |
|---|---|---|---|---|---|
| Command | 0 | 14 | 13 | 19 | 46 |
| Vigilantes | 13 | 10 | 14 | 16 | 53 |

at American Airlines Center, Dallas, Texas

- Date: March 12
- Game time: Noon CST
- Game attendance: 5,129
- Recap

Game information

1st quarter

- Dallas – (9:11) Derrick Ross 37-yard run (Remy Hamilton kick failed), Dallas 6–0
- Dallas – (3:31) Derrick Ross 1-yard run (Remy Hamilton kick), Dallas 13–0

2nd quarter

- Kansas City – (14:14) Aaron Hosack 2-yard pass from J.J. Raterink (Mike Salerno kick), Dallas 13–7
- Kansas City – (11:15) Bret Smith 11-yard pass from J.J. Raterink (Mike Salerno kick), Kansas City 14–13
- Dallas – (1:00) Matt Fields 4-yard pass from Dan Raudabaugh (Remy Hamilton kick), Dallas 20–14
- Dallas – (0:00) Remy Hamilton 20-yard field goal, Dallas 23–14

3rd quarter

- Dallas – (14:29) Tiger Jones 23-yard pass from Dan Raudabaugh (Remy Hamilton kick), Dallas 30–14
- Kansas City – (8:59) Bret Smith 19-yard pass from J.J. Raterink (Mike Salerno kick), Dallas 30–21
- Dallas – (4:21) Matt Fields 2-yard run (Remy Hamilton kick), Dallas 37–21
- Kansas City – (1:20) Steven Savoy 24-yard pass from J.J. Raterink (Mike Salerno kick failed), Dallas 37–27

4th quarter

- Dallas – (9:33) Derrick Ross 4-yard run (Remy Hamilton kick), Dallas 44–27
- Dallas – (8:11) Team safety, Dallas 46–27
- Kansas City – (4:21) Bret Smith 21-yard pass from J.J. Raterink (J.J. Raterink pass failed), Dallas 46–33
- Kansas City – (1:29) Aaron Hosack 4-yard pass from J.J. Raterink (Mike Salerno kick), Dallas 46–40
- Dallas – (0:30) Derrick Ross 5-yard run (Remy Hamilton kick), Dallas 53–40
- Kansas City – (0:00) Aaron Hosack 13-yard pass from J.J. Raterink, Dallas 53–46

Passing

- Kansas City – J.J. Raterink: 32/48, 338 yards, 7 TD
- Dallas – Dan Raudabaugh: 21/34, 250 yards, 2 TD, 1 INT

Rushing

- Kansas City – J.J. Raterink: 1 att, 0 yards
- Dallas – Derrick Ross: 15 att, 66 yards, 4 TD

Receiving

- Kansas City – Bret Smith: 11 rec, 133 yards, 3 TD
- Dallas – Matt Fields: 8 rec, 74 yards, 1 TD

=== Week 2: vs. Tulsa Talons ===
Week 2: Tulsa Talons at Dallas Vigilantes – Game summary

| Quarter | 1 | 2 | 3 | 4 | Total |
|---|---|---|---|---|---|
| Talons | 0 | 33 | 0 | 7 | 40 |
| Vigilantes | 14 | 21 | 7 | 22 | 64 |

at American Airlines Center, Dallas, Texas

- Date: March 19
- Game time: Noon CDT
- Game attendance: 7,177
- Referee: Scott Vaughan
- Recap

Game information

1st quarter

- Dallas – (9:21) Derrick Ross 1-yard run (Remy Hamilton kick), Dallas 7–0
- Dallas – (2:20) Anthony Jones 12-yard pass from Dan Raudabaugh (Remy Hamilton kick), Dallas 14–0

2nd quarter

- Tulsa – (14:25) Bobby Reid 5-yard run (Juan Bongarra kick failed), Dallas 14–6
- Dallas – (11:36) Anthony Jones 24-yard pass from Dan Raudabaugh (Remy Hamilton kick), Dallas 21–6
- Tulsa – (10:53) Fred Shaw 8-yard kickoff return (Juan Bongarra kick), Dallas 21–13
- Tulsa – (8:23) Brandon Copeland 16-yard pass from Bobby Reid (Jamar Ransom rush), Tied 21–21
- Dallas – (5:11) Matt Fields 22-yard pass from Dan Raudabaugh (Remy Hamilton kick), Dallas 28–21
- Tulsa – (2:49) Bobby Reid 27-yard run (Juan Bongarra kick failed), Dallas 28–27
- Dallas – (1:43) DeAndrew Rubin 44-yard pass from Dan Raudabaugh (Remy Hamilton kick), Dallas 35–27
- Tulsa – (0:14) Victor Degrate 3-yard pass from Bobby Reid (Bobby Reid rush failed), Dallas 35–33

3rd quarter

- Dallas – (7:09) Matt Fields 14-yard pass from Dan Raudabaugh (Remy Hamilton kick), Dallas 42–33

4th quarter

- Tulsa – (11:54) Bobby Reid 16-yard run (Juan Bongarra kick), Dallas 42–40
- Dallas – (10:05) Matt Fields 33-yard pass from Dan Raudabaugh (Remy Hamilton kick), Dallas 49–40
- Dallas – (8:36) Team safety, Dallas 51–40
- Dallas – (5:01) Matt Fields 20-yard pass from Dan Raudabaugh (Remy Hamilton kick failed), Dallas 57–40
- Dallas – (2:12) DeAndrew Rubin 2-yard pass from Dan Raudabaugh (Remy Hamilton kick), Dallas 64–40

Passing

- Tulsa – Bobby Reid: 17/32, 173 yards, 2 TD, 1 INT
- Dallas – Dan Raudabaugh: 21/38, 297 yards, 8 TD, 1 INT

Rushing

- Tulsa – Bobby Reid: 7 att, 84 yards, 3 TD
- Dallas – Derrick Ross: 7 att, 24 yards, 1 TD

Receiving

- Tulsa – Bryan Paysinger: 7 rec, 71 yards
- Dallas – Matt Fields: 6 rec, 123 yards, 4 TD

=== Week 4: at Utah Blaze ===
Week 4: Dallas Vigilantes at Utah Blaze – Game summary

| Quarter | 1 | 2 | 3 | 4 | Total |
|---|---|---|---|---|---|
| Vigilantes | 7 | 13 | 6 | 14 | 40 |
| Blaze | 7 | 27 | 21 | 14 | 69 |

at EnergySolutions Arena, Salt Lake City, Utah

- Date: March 31
- Game time: 6:00 p.m. CDT
- Game attendance: 7,163
- Referee: Shawn Hochuli
- Recap

Game information

1st quarter

- Utah – (9:34) Ernest Pierce 5-yard pass from Tommy Grady (Greg Gunderson kick), Utah 7–0
- Dallas – (6:43) Anthony Jones 8-yard pass from Dan Raudabaugh (Remy Hamilton kick), Tied 7–7

2nd quarter

- Utah – (14:58) Ben Stallings 1-yard run (Greg Gunderson kick), Utah 14–7
- Dallas – (10:02) Anthony Jones 32-yard pass from Dan Raudabaugh (Remy Hamilton kick failed), Utah 14–13
- Utah – (8:19) Alvance Robinson 11-yard pass from Tommy Grady (Greg Gunderson kick), Utah 21–13
- Dallas – (7:16) Matt Fields 18-yard pass from Dan Raudabaugh (Remy Hamilton kick), Utah 21–20
- Utah – (1:49) Aaron Lesue 8-yard pass from Tommy Grady (Greg Gunderson kick), Utah 28–20
- Utah – (0:08) Alvance Robinson 13-yard pass from Tommy Grady (Greg Gunderson kick blocked), Utah 34–20

3rd quarter

- Dallas – (12:33) Derrick Ross 1-yard run (Remy Hamilton kick failed), Utah 34–26
- Utah – (10:17) Ben Stallings 1-yard run (Greg Gunderson kick), Utah 41–26
- Utah – (5:28) Aaron Boone 19-yard pass from Tommy Grady (Greg Gunderson kick), Utah 48–26
- Utah – (1:28) Aaron Boone 35-yard pass from Tommy Grady (Greg Gunderson kick), Utah 55–26

4th quarter

- Dallas – (14:42) Matt Fields 11-yard pass from Dan Radabaugh (Luke Drone rush failed), Utah 55–32
- Utah – (10:59) Tommy Grady 1-yard run (Greg Gunderson kick), Utah 62–32
- Dallas – (9:20) Anthony Jones 9-yard pass from Dan Raudabaugh (Derrick Ross rush), Utah 62–40
- Utah – (6:32) Tommy Grady 1-yard run (Greg Gunderson kick), Utah 69–40

Passing

- Dallas – Dan Raudabaugh: 15/19, 220 yards, 5 TD, 3 INT
- Utah – Tommy Grady: 28/46, 342 yards, 6 TD

Rushing

- Dallas – Derrick Ross: 6 att, 29 yards, 1 TD
- Utah – Ben Stallings: 6 att, 4 yards, 2 TD

Receiving

- Dallas – Anthony Jones: 10 rec, 133 yards, 3 TD
- Utah – Aaron Boone: 13 rec, 226 yards, 2 TD

=== Week 5: at Georgia Force ===
Week 5: Dallas Vigilantes at Georgia Force – Game summary

| Quarter | 1 | 2 | 3 | 4 | Total |
|---|---|---|---|---|---|
| Vigilantes | 13 | 21 | 7 | 7 | 48 |
| Force | 7 | 21 | 13 | 14 | 55 |

at Arena at Gwinnett Center, Duluth, Georgia

- Date: April 8
- Game time: 7:00 p.m. CDT
- Game attendance: 6,335
- Referee: Kevin Stine
- Recap

Game information

1st quarter

- Dallas – (6:40) Derrick Ross 1-yard run (Remy Hamilton kick), Dallas 7–0
- Georgia – (5:05) Larry Shipp 37-yard pass from Brett Elliott (Carlos Martinez kick), Tied 7–7
- Dallas – (1:17) Anthony Jones 29-yard pass from Dan Raudabaugh (Remy Hamilton kick failed), Dallas 13–7

2nd quarter

- Georgia – (13:04) C.J. Johnson 16-yard pass from Brett Elliott (Carlos Martinez kick), Georgia 14–13
- Georgia – (12:14) Ryan Bowers 0-yard fumble recovery (Carlos Martinez kick), Georgia 21–13
- Dallas – (8:08) Derrick Ross 1-yard run (Remy Hamilton kick), Georgia 21–20
- Georgia – (3:45) Maurice Purify 14-yard pass from Brett Elliott (Carlos Martinez kick), Georgia 28–20
- Dallas – (0:45) Derrick Ross 2-yard run (Remy Hamilton kick), Georgia 28–27
- Dallas – (0:25) Justin Warren 34-yard fumble recovery (Remy Hamilton kick), Dallas 34–28

3rd quarter

- Georgia – (10:53) Mike Johnson 3-yard pass from Brett Elliott (Carlos Martinez kick), Georgia 35–34
- Dallas – (1:53) Matt Fields 3-yard run (Remy Hamilton kick), Dallas 41–35
- Georgia – (0:15) Larry Shipp 38-yard pass from Brett Elliott (Carlos Martinez kick failed), Tied 41–41

4th quarter

- Dallas – (13:57) Derrick Ross 20-yard run (Remy Hamilton kick), Dallas 48–41
- Georgia – (12:05) Maurice Purify 8-yard pass from Brett Elliott (Carlos Martinez kick), Tied 48–48
- Georgia – (0:11) Larry Shipp 29-yard pass from Brett Elliott (Carlos Martinez kick), Georgia 55–48

Passing

- Dallas – Dan Raudabaugh: 20/36, 228 yards, 1 TD, 3 INT
- Georgia – Brett Elliot: 23/39, 373 yards, 7 TD, 1 INT

Rushing

- Dallas – Derrick Ross: 13 att, 66 yards, 4 TD
- Georgia – Brett Elliot: 1 att, −2 yards

Receiving

- Dallas – Anthony Jones: 13 rec, 153 yards, 1 TD
- Georgia – Larry Shipp: 9 rec, 213 yards, 3 TD

=== Week 6: vs. Milwaukee Mustangs ===
Week 6: Milwaukee Mustangs at Dallas Vigilantes – Game summary

| Quarter | 1 | 2 | 3 | 4 | Total |
|---|---|---|---|---|---|
| Mustangs | 6 | 9 | 0 | 6 | 21 |
| Vigilantes | 7 | 28 | 7 | 7 | 49 |

at American Airlines Center, Dallas, Texas

- Date: April 15
- Game time: 7:30 p.m. CDT
- Game attendance: 6,014
- Referee: Chris Snead
- Recap

Game information

1st quarter

- Dallas – (7:16) Derrick Ross 4-yard run (Remy Hamilton kick), Dallas 7–0
- Milwaukee – (2:24) R.J. Archer 1-yard run (Garrett Lindholm kick failed), Dallas 7–6

2nd quarter

- Dallas – (12:45) Matt Fields 1-yard run (Remy Hamilton kick), Dallas 14–6
- Milwaukee – (6:00) Garrett Lindholm 28-yard field goal, Dallas 14–9
- Dallas – (5:03) DeAndrew Rubin 41-yard pass from Dan Raudabaugh (Remy Hamilton kick), Dallas 21–9
- Dallas – (0:53) Tony Washington 12-yard pass from Dan Raudabaugh (Remy Hamilton kick), Dallas 28–9
- Milwaukee – (0:44) Mykel Benson 7-yard run (R.J. Archer pass failed), Dallas 28–15
- Dallas – (0:07) Anthony Jones 20-yard pass from Dan Raudabaugh (Remy Hamilton kick), Dallas 35–15

3rd quarter

- Dallas – (2:03) Derrick Ross 1-yard run (Remy Hamilton kick), Dallas 42–15

4th quarter

- Milwaukee – (11:34) Mykel Benson 2-yard run (R.J. Archer pass failed), Dallas 42–21
- Dallas – (7:08) DeAndrew Rubin 9-yard pass from Dan Raudabaugh (Remy Hamilton kick), Dallas 49–21

Passing

- Milwaukee – R.J. Archer: 15/33, 152 yards, 3 INT
- Dallas – Dan Raudabaugh: 14/25, 225 yards, 4 TD, 1 INT

Rushing

- Milwaukee – Mykel Benson: 6 att, 18 yards, 2 TD
- Dallas – Derrick Ross: 12 att, 40 yards, 2 TD

Receiving

- Milwaukee – Ernest Smith: 7 rec, 72 yards
- Dallas – DeAndrew Rubin: 4 rec, 84 yards, 2 TD

=== Week 7: at Tampa Bay Storm ===
Week 7: Dallas Vigilantes at Tampa Bay Storm – Game summary

| Quarter | 1 | 2 | 3 | 4 | Total |
|---|---|---|---|---|---|
| Vigilantes | 12 | 21 | 20 | 14 | 67 |
| Storm | 20 | 7 | 7 | 27 | 61 |

at St. Pete Times Forum, Tampa, Florida

- Date: April 23
- Game time: 6:30 p.m. CDT
- Game attendance: 12,226
- Referee: Kevin Stein
- Recap

Game information

1st quarter

- Tampa Bay – (11:52) Huey Whittaker 6-yard pass from Grant Gregory (Kyle Chilton kick), Tampa Bay 7–0
- Tampa Bay – (7:28) Huey Whittaker 40-yard pass from Grant Gregory (Kyle Chilton kick failed), Tampa Bay 13–0
- Dallas – (5:41) Anthony Jones 15-yard pass from Dan Raudabaugh (Remy Hamilton kick failed), Tampa Bay 13–6
- Tampa Bay – (3:45) Amari Jackson 14-yard pass from Grant Gregory (Kyle Chilton kick), Tampa Bay 20–6
- Dallas – (1:09) Matt Fields 5-yard run (Remy Hamilton rush fumbled), Tampa Bay 20–12

2nd quarter

- Tampa Bay – (9:11) Eric Ortiz 1-yard run (Kyle Chilton kick), Tampa Bay 27–12
- Dallas – (4:33) Derrick Ross 2-yard run (Remy Hamilton kick), Tampa Bay 27–19
- Dallas – (1:28) Justin Warren 15-yard interception return (Remy Hamilton kick), Tampa Bay 27–26
- Dallas – (0:00) Greg Ryan 0-yard net recovery (Remy Hamilton kick), Dallas 33–27

3rd quarter

- Tampa Bay – (13:00) Huey Whittaker 4-yard pass from Grant Gregory (Kyle Chilton kick), Tampa Bay 34–33
- Dallas – (11:13) Matt Fields 37-yard pass from Dan Raudabaugh (Remy Hamilton kick), Dallas 40–34
- Dallas – (4:42) Anthony Jones 9-yard pass from Dan Raudabaugh (Remy Hamilton kick failed), Dallas 46–34
- Dallas – (4:02) James Bear 0-yard net recovery (Remy Hamilton kick), Dallas 53–34

4th quarter

- Tampa Bay – (14:13) Huey Whittaker 5-yard pass from Grant Gregory (Kyle Chilton kick), Dallas 53–41
- Dallas – (12:33) Matt Fields 4-yard run (Remy Hamilton kick), Dallas 60–41
- Dallas – (5:25) Matt Fields 41-yard pass from Dan Raudabaugh (Remy Hamilton kick), Dallas 67–41
- Tampa Bay – (2:46) Huey Whittaker 9-yard pass from Brian Zbydniewski (Kyle Chilton kick failed), Dallas 67–47
- Tampa Bay – (0:12) Hank Edwards 7-yard pass from Brian Zbydniewski (Brian Zbydniewski pass), Dallas 67–55
- Tampa Bay – (0:00) Michael Lindsey 33-yard pass from Brian Zbydniewski, Dallas 67–61

Passing

- Dallas – Dan Raudabaugh: 13/20, 202 yards, 4 TD
- Tampa Bay – Grant Gregory: 24/42, 275 yards, 5 TD, 3 INT

Rushing

- Dallas – Derrick Ross: 12 att, 39 yards, 1 TD
- Tampa Bay – Eric Ortiz: 1 att, 1 yard, 1 TD

Receiving

- Dallas – Matt Fields: 5 rec, 116 yards, 2 TD
- Tampa Bay – Huey Whittaker: 15 rec, 193 yards, 5 TD

=== Week 8: at Kansas City Command ===
Week 8: Dallas Vigilantes at Kansas City Command – Game summary

| Quarter | 1 | 2 | 3 | 4 | Total |
|---|---|---|---|---|---|
| Vigilantes | 14 | 14 | 21 | 23 | 72 |
| Command | 29 | 8 | 13 | 13 | 63 |

at Sprint Center, Kansas City, Missouri

- Date: April 29
- Game time: 6:30 p.m. CDT
- Game attendance: 3,502
- Referee: Jim Corpora
- Recap^{[usurped]}

Game information

1st quarter

- Kansas City – (13:12) Aaron Hosack 6-yard pass from J.J. Raterink (Brian Umstead kick), Kansas City 7–0
- Dallas – (12:13) DeAndrew Rubin 45-yard pass from Dan Raudabaugh (Remy Hamilton kick), 7–7
- Kansas City – (10:13) Bret Smith 18-yard pass from J.J. Raterink (Brian Umstead kick failed), Kansas City 13–7
- Kansas City – (9:05) Erick Harris 0-yard net recovery (Brian Umstead kick), Kansas City 20–7
- Kansas City – (8:25) Bryan Robinson safety, Kansas City 22–7
- Kansas City – (5:26) Steven Savoy 5-yard pass from J.J. Raterink (Brian Umstead kick), Kansas City 29–7
- Dallas – (3:37) DeAndrew Rubin 9-yard pass from Dan Raudabaugh (Remy Hamilton kick), Kansas City 29–14

2nd quarter

- Dallas – (14:56) Matt Fields 11-yard pass from Dan Raudabaugh (Remy Hamilton kick), Kansas City 29–21
- Dallas – (6:52) Derrick Ross 6-yard run (Remy Hamilton kick), Kansas City 29–28
- Kansas City – (0:48) Bret Smith 2-yard pass from J.J. Raterink (Brian Umstead kick failed), Kansas City 35–28
- Kansas City – (0:28) Tyus Jackson safety, Kansas City 37–28

3rd quarter

- Dallas – (11:04) Derrick Ross 1-yard run (Remy Hamilton kick), Kansas City 37–35
- Kansas City – (9:54) Aaron Hosack 35-yard pass from J.J. Raterink (Brian Umstead kick), Kansas City 44–35
- Dallas – (7:36) DeAndrew Rubin 38-yard pass from Dan Raudabaugh (Remy Hamilton kick), Kansas City 44–42
- Dallas – (1:30) Anthony Jones 35-yard pass from Dan Raudabaugh (Remy Hamilton kick), Dallas 49–44
- Kansas City – (0:04) Christian Wise 37-yard pass from J.J. Raterink (Brian Umstead kick failed), Kansas City 50–49

4th quarter

- Dallas – (11:13) Matt Fields 4-yard pass from Dan Raudabaugh (Remy Hamilton kick), Dallas 56–50
- Kansas City – (8:12) Bret Smith 12-yard pass from J.J. Raterink (Brian Umstead kick failed), 56–56
- Dallas – (3:29) Derrick Ross 14-yard run (Remy Hamilton kick), Dallas 63–56
- Kansas City – (00:42) Aaron Hosack 31-yard pass from J.J. Raterink (Brian Umstead kick), 63–63
- Dallas – (0:14) Anthony Jones 6-yard pass from Dan Raudabaugh (Remy Hamilton kick), Dallas 70–63
- Dallas – (0:00) Dusty Bear safety, Dallas 72–63

Passing

- Dallas – Dan Raudabaugh: 29/35, 377 yards, 7 TD
- Kansas City – J.J. Raterink: 20/32, 343 yards, 8 TD, 1 INT

Rushing

- Dallas – Derrick Ross: 6 att, 24 yards, 3 TD
- Kansas City – J.J. Raterink: 10 att, 20 yards

Receiving

- Dallas – Matt Fields: 14 rec, 149 yards, 2 TD
- Kansas City – Aaron Hosack: 15 rec, 167 yards, 3 TD

=== Week 9: vs. Iowa Barnstormers ===
Week 9: Iowa Barnstormers at Dallas Vigilantes – Game summary

| Quarter | 1 | 2 | 3 | 4 | Total |
|---|---|---|---|---|---|
| Barnstormers | 17 | 20 | 7 | 13 | 57 |
| Vigilantes | 14 | 27 | 14 | 16 | 71 |

at American Airlines Center, Dallas, Texas

- Date: May 7
- Game time: 7:30 p.m. CDT
- Game attendance: 6,634
- Referee: Chris Snead
- Recap^{[usurped]}

Game information

1st quarter

- Iowa – (12:19) Kyle Schlicher 29-yard field goal, Iowa 3–0
- Dallas – (10:22) DeAndrew Rubin 14-yard pass from Dan Raudabaugh (Remy Hamilton kick), Dallas 7–3
- Iowa – (6:38) Todd Blythe 11-yard pass from Brad Banks (Kyle Schlicher kick), Iowa 10–7
- Iowa – (4:22) Pat Stoudamire 16-yard interception return (Kyle Schlicher kick), Iowa 17–7
- Dallas – (1:19) DeAndrew Rubin 29-yard pas from Dan Raudabaugh (Remy Hamilton kick), Iowa 17–14

2nd quarter

- Iowa – (9:28) Jesse Schmidt 8-yard pass from Brad Banks (Kyle Schlicher kick), Iowa 24–14
- Dallas – (8:17) DeAndrew Rubin 21-yard pass from Dan Raudabaugh (Remy Hamilton kick), Iowa 24–21
- Dallas – (4:27) Anthony Jones 8-yard pass from Dan Raudabaugh (Remy Hamilton kick failed), Dallas 27–24
- Dallas – (1:00) Anthony Jones 31-yard pass from Dan Raudabaugh (Remy Hamilton kick), Dallas 34–24
- Iowa – (00:36) Brad Banks 1-yard run (Kyle Schlicher kick), Dallas 34–31
- Iowa – (00:34) Clarence Ward 1-yard net recovery (Kyle Schlicher kick failed), Iowa 37–34
- Dallas – (00:23) Anthony Jones 9-yard pass from Dan Raudabaugh (Remy Hamilton kick), Dallas 41–37

3rd quarter

- Dallas – (13:02) Derrick Ross 1-yard run (Remy Hamilton kick), Dallas 48–37
- Iowa – (9:28) Jesse Schmidt 5-yard pass from Brad Banks (Kyle Schlicher kick), Dallas 48–44
- Dallas – (3:14) Derrick Ross 1-yard run (Remy Hamilton kick), Dallas 55–44

4th quarter

- Dallas – (9:30) Derrick Ross 6-yard run (Remy Hamilton Kick), Dallas 62–44
- Dallas – (8:01) Team safety (Iowa penalized in end zone), Dallas 64–44
- Iowa – (4:03) Todd Blythe 2-yard pass from Brad Banks (Kyle Schlicher kick failed), Dallas 64–50
- Dallas – (2:37) Anthony Jones 6-yard pass from Dan Raudabaugh (Remy Hamilton kick), Dallas 71–50
- Iowa – (1:28) Errick McCown 47-yard pass from Brad Banks (Kyle Schlicher kick), Dallas 71–57

Passing

- Iowa – Brad Banks: 19/34, 268 yards, 5 TD, 3 INT
- Dallas – Dan Raudabaugh: 18/34, 249 yards, 7 TD, 2 INT

Rushing

- Iowa – Brad Banks: 8 att, 36 yards, 1 TD
- Dallas – Derrick Ross: 10 att, 29 yards, 3 TD

Receiving

- Iowa – Jesse Schmidt: 9 rec, 91 yards, 2 TD
- Dallas – Anthony Jones: 7 rec, 81 yards, 4 TD

=== Week 10: at Spokane Shock ===
Week 10: Dallas Vigilantes at Spokane Shock – Game summary

| Quarter | 1 | 2 | 3 | 4 | Total |
|---|---|---|---|---|---|
| Vigilantes | 20 | 6 | 7 | 16 | 49 |
| Shock | 13 | 28 | 16 | 14 | 71 |

at Spokane Veterans Memorial Arena, Spokane, Washington

- Date: May 14
- Game time: 9:00 p.m. CDT
- Game attendance: 9,368
- Referee: Shane Anderson
- Recap

Game information

1st quarter

- Dallas – (12:27) Anthony Jones 23-yard pass from Dan Raudabaugh (Cory Long kick), Dallas 7–0
- Spokane – (10:13) Raul Vijil 8-yard pass from Bill Stull (Taylor Rowan kick blocked), Dallas 7–6
- Dallas – (4:49) Matt Fields 5-yard pass from Dan Raudabaugh (Cory Long kick), Dallas 14–6
- Spokane – (2:00) Bill Stull 11-yard run (Taylor Rowan kick), Dallas 14–13
- Dallas – (0:59) Derrick Ross 3-yard run (Cory Long kick failed), Dallas 20–13

2nd quarter

- Spokane – (12:55) Clay Harrell 8-yard run (Taylor Rowan kick), Tied 20–20
- Spokane – (11:35) Lance Witherspoon 5-yard fumble recovery (Taylor Rowan kick), Spokane 27–20
- Dallas – (6:03) Anthony Jones 10-yard pass from Dan Raudabaugh (Cory Long kick blocked) Spokane 27–26
- Spokane – (2:15) Raul Vijil 4-yard pass from Kyle Rowley (Taylor Rowan kick), Spokane 34–26
- Spokane – (0:05) Raul Vijil 4-yard pass from Kyle Rowley (Taylor Rowan kick), Spokane 41–26

3rd quarter

- Spokane – (9:45) Greg Orton 5-yard pass from Kyle Rowley (Taylor Rowan kick), Spokane 48–26
- Spokane – (7:48) Khreem Smith safety, Spokane 50–26
- Spokane – (6:46) Greg Orton 23-yard pass from Kyle Rowley (Taylor Rowan kick), Spokane 57–26
- Dallas – (2:11) DeAndrew Rubin 16-yard pass from Dan Raudabaugh (Cory Long kick), Spokane 57–33

4th quarter

- Spokane – (11:25) Greg Orton 6-yard pass from Kyle Rowley (Taylor Rowan kick), Spokane 64–33
- Dallas – (8:48) DeAndrew Rubin 35-yard pass from Luke Drone (Luke Drone pass failed), Spokane 64–39
- Spokane – (7:50) Antwan Marsh 4-yard kickoff return (Taylor Rowan kick), Spokane 71–39
- Dallas – (6:54) DeAndrew Rubin 30-yard pass from Luke Drone (Luke Drone pass), Spokane 71–47
- Dallas – (4:58) Kelvin Kinney safety, Spokane 71–49

Passing

- Dallas – Dan Raudabaugh: 15/21, 162 yards, 4 TD
- Spokane – Kyle Rowley: 18/28, 169 yards, 5 TD

Rushing

- Dallas – Derrick Ross: 7 att, 18 yards, 1 TD
- Spokane – Bill Stull: 1 att, 11 yards, 1 TD

Receiving

- Dallas – DeAndrew Rubin: 9 rec, 134 yards, 3 TD
- Spokane – Greg Orton: 7 rec, 86 yards, 3 TD

=== Week 11: at Chicago Rush ===
Week 11: Dallas Vigilantes at Chicago Rush – Game summary

| Quarter | 1 | 2 | 3 | 4 | Total |
|---|---|---|---|---|---|
| Vigilantes | 14 | 10 | 13 | 20 | 57 |
| Rush | 14 | 14 | 20 | 21 | 69 |

at Allstate Arena, Rosemont, Illinois

- Date: May 22
- Game time: 3:00 p.m. CDT
- Game attendance: 9,535
- Referee: Alex Kemp
- Recap

Game information

1st quarter

- Dallas – (11:37) Derrick Ross 1-yard run (Remy Hamilton kick), Dallas 7–0
- Chicago – (8:09) Reggie Gray 4-yard pass from Russ Michna (Chris Gould kick), Tied 7–7
- Chicago – (2:41) Reggie Gray 12-yard pass from Russ Michna (Chris Gould kick), Chicago 14–7
- Dallas – (0:00) Matt Fields 18-yard pass from Dan Raudabaugh (Remy Hamilton kick), Tied 14–14

2nd quarter

- Dallas – (9:27) Remy Hamilton 33-yard field goal, Dallas 17–14
- Chicago – (5:48) Charles Dillon 23-yard pass from Russ Michna (Chris Gould kick), Chicago 21–17
- Dallas – (3:57) Anthony Jones 21-yard pass from Dan Raudabaugh (Remy Hamilton kick), Dallas 24–21
- Chicago – (0:07) Marcus Waugh 1-yard run (Chris Gould kick), Chicago 28–24

3rd quarter

- Chicago – (14:27) Reggie Gray 40-yard pass from Russ Michna (Chris Gould kick), Chicago 35–24
- Dallas – (12:25) Derrick Ross 1-yard run (Remy Hamilton kick blocked), Chicago 35–30
- Chicago – (8:10) T.J. Watkins 11-yard pass from Russ Michna (Chris Gould kick failed), Chicago 41–30
- Dallas – (4:51) Derrick Ross 1-yard run (Remy Hamilton kick), Chicago 41–37
- Chicago – (2:05) Marco Thomas 8-yard pass from Russ Michna (Chris Gould kick), Chicago 48–37

4th quarter

- Dallas – (13:02) Anthony Jones 6-yard pass from Dan Raudabaugh (Remy Hamilton kick), Chicago 48–44
- Chicago – (11:48) Charles Dillon 48-yard pass from Russ Michna (Chris Gould kick), Chicago 55–44
- Chicago – (8:03) Kelvin Morris 55-yard interception return (Chris Gould kick), Chicago 62–44
- Dallas – (6:02) Matt Fields 10-yard pass from Dan Raudabaugh (Remy Hamilton kick blocked), Chicago 62–50
- Chicago – (2:59) Johnie Kirton 3-yard run (Chris Gould kick), Chicago 69–50
- Dallas – (0:37) DeAndrew Rubin 12-yard pass from Dan Raudabaugh (Remy Hamilton kick), Chicago 69–57

Passing

- Dallas – Dan Raudabaugh: 29/39, 322 yards, 5 TD, 2 INT
- Chicago – Russ Michna: 20/24, 264 yards, 7 TD

Rushing

- Dallas – Derrick Ross: 7 att, 22 yards, 3 TD
- Chicago – Johnie Kirton: 13 att, 28 yards, 1 TD

Receiving

- Dallas – Anthony Jones: 16 rec, 179 yards, 2 TD
- Chicago – Charles Dillon: 6 rec, 113 yards, 2 TD

=== Week 12: vs. Pittsburgh Power ===
Week 12: Pittsburgh Power at Dallas Vigilantes – Game summary

| Quarter | 1 | 2 | 3 | 4 | Total |
|---|---|---|---|---|---|
| Power | 13 | 14 | 14 | 35 | 76 |
| Vigilantes | 13 | 21 | 7 | 34 | 75 |

at American Airlines Center, Dallas, Texas

- Date: May 28
- Game time: 7:30 p.m. CDT
- Game attendance: 9,876
- Referee: Joe Pester
- Recap

Game information

1st quarter

- Pittsburgh – (11:27) Michael Washington 18-yard pass from Bernard Morris (Paul Edinger kick), Pittsburgh 7–0
- Dallas – (10:15) Anthony Jones 28-yard pass from Dan Raudabaugh (Remy Hamilton kick), Tied 7–7
- Pittsburgh – (5:28) Michael Washington 1-yard run (Paul Edinger kick failed), Pittsburgh 13–7
- Dallas – (2:13) DeAndrew Rubin 15-yard pass from Dan Raudabaugh (Remy Hamilton kick failed), Tied 13–13

2nd quarter

- Dallas – (10:54) Matt Fields 6-yard pass from Dan Raudabaugh (Remy Hamilton kick), Dallas 20–13
- Pittsburgh – (6:11) Michael Washington 14-yard pass from Bernard Morris (Paul Edinger kick), Tied 20–20
- Dallas – (4:34) Anthony Jones 30-yard pass from Dan Raudabaugh (Remy Hamilton kick), Dallas 27–20
- Dallas – (3:29) R.J. Jackson 0-yard net recovery (Remy Hamilton kick), Dallas 34–20
- Pittsburgh – (0:52) Bernard Morris 27-yard run (Paul Edinger kick), Dallas 34–27

3rd quarter

- Pittsburgh – (9:41) Michael Washington 39-yard pass from Bernard Morris (Paul Edinger kick), Tied 34–34
- Pittsburgh – (3:50) Lonnell Dewalt 2-yard pass from Bernard Morris (Paul Edinger kick), Pittsburgh 41–34
- Dallas – (1:24) Tony Washington 7-yard pass from Dan Raudabaugh (Remy Hamilton kick), Tied 41–41

4th quarter

- Pittsburgh – (10:17) Joshua Rue 1-yard run (Paul Edinger kick), Pittsburgh 48–41
- Dallas – (8:40) DeAndrew Rubin 37-yard pass from Dan Raudabaugh (Remy Hamilton kick), Tied 48–48
- Pittsburgh – (7:13) Michael Washington 45-yard pass from Bernard Morris (Paul Edinger kick), Pittsburgh 55–48
- Dallas – (4:56) Matt Fields 27-yard pass from Dan Raudabaugh (Remy Hamilton kick), Tied 55–55
- Pittsburgh – (3:11) Jason Willis 16-yard pass from Bernard Morris (Paul Edinger kick), Pittsburgh 62–55
- Dallas – (1:39) Anthony Jones 22-yard pass from Dan Raudabaugh (Remy Hamilton kick), Tied 62–62
- Pittsburgh – (0:50) D.J. Hall 9-yard pass from Bernard Morris (Paul Edinger kick), Pittsburgh 69–62
- Dallas – (0:41) Anthony Jones 40-yard pass from Dan Raudabaugh (Remy Hamilton kick), Tied 69–69
- Pittsburgh – (0:27) Joshua Rue 3-yard run (Paul Edinger kick), Pittsburgh 76–69
- Dallas – (0:10) DeAndrew Rubin 22-yard pass from Dan Raudabaugh (Dan Raudabaugh pass failed), Pittsburgh 76–75

Passing

- Pittsburgh – Bernard Morris: 25/40, 280 yards, 7 TD
- Dallas – Dan Raudabaugh: 28/36, 433 yards, 10 TD

Rushing

- Pittsburgh – Bernard Morris: 7 att, 41 yards, 1 TD
- Dallas – Derrick Ross: 3 att, 14 yards

Receiving

- Pittsburgh – Michael Washington: 12 rec, 184 yards, 4 TD
- Dallas – Anthony Jones: 10 rec, 221 yards, 4 TD

=== Week 13: vs. San Jose SaberCats ===
Week 13: San Jose SaberCats at Dallas Vigilantes – Game summary

| Quarter | 1 | 2 | 3 | 4 | Total |
|---|---|---|---|---|---|
| SaberCats | 14 | 21 | 9 | 13 | 57 |
| Vigilantes | 28 | 21 | 14 | 7 | 70 |

at American Airlines Center, Dallas, Texas

- Date: June 4
- Game time: 7:30 p.m. CDT
- Game attendance: 8,463
- Referee: Chris Snead
- Recap

Game information

1st quarter

- Dallas – (12:17) DeAndrew Rubin 22-yard pass from Dan Raudabaugh (Remy Hamilton kick), Dallas 7–0
- San Jose – (11:08) Burl Toler 13-yard pass from Mark Grieb (Juan Gamboa kick), Tied 7–7
- Dallas – (8:43) Anthony Jones 0-yard fumble recovery (Remy Hamilton kick), Dallas 14–7
- Dallas – (6:30) Brendan Pahulu 17-yard interception return (Remy Hamilton kick), Dallas 21–7
- San Jose – (3:48) Ben Nelson 11-yard pass from Mark Grieb (Juan Gamboa kick), Dallas 21–14
- Dallas – (0:23) Derrick Ross 3-yard run (Remy Hamilton kick), Dallas 28–14

2nd quarter

- San Jose – (14:54) Ben Nelson 37-yard pass from Mark Grieb (Juan Gamboa kick), Dallas 28–21
- Dallas – (11:22) Derrick Ross 4-yard run (Remy Hamilton kick), Dallas 35–21
- San Jose – (6:15) Scott Schoettgen 15-yard pass from Mark Grieb (Juan Gamboa kick), Dallas 35–28
- Dallas – (5:00) Anthony Jones 17-yard pass from Dan Raudabaugh (Remy Hamilton kick), Dallas 42–28
- Dallas – (1:08) Chris Brown 20-yard interception return (Remy Hamilton kick), Dallas 49–28
- San Jose – (0:35) Scott Schoettgen 4-yard pass from Mark Grieb (Juan Gamboa kick), Dallas 49–35

3rd quarter

- San Jose – (10:44) Juan Gamboa 41-yard field goal, Dallas 49–38
- Dallas – (8:56) Anthony Jones 38-yard pass from Dan Raudabaugh (Remy Hamilton kick), Dallas 56–38
- San Jose – (6:43) Scott Schoettgen 14-yard pass from Mark Grieb (Juan Gamboa kick failed), Dallas 56–44
- Dallas – (4:44) Derrick Ross 1-yard run (Remy Hamilton kick), Dallas 63–44

4th quarter

- San Jose – (12:07) Ben Nelson 7-yard pass from McLeod Bethel-Thompson (Juan Gamboa kick), Dallas 63–51
- Dallas – (11:57) Anthony Jones 13-yard pass from Dan Raudabaugh (Remy Hamilton kick), Dallas 70–51
- San Jose – (0:54) Ben Nelson 24-yard pass from McLeod Bethel-Thompson (McLeod Bethel-Thompson pass failed), Dallas 70–57

Passing

- San Jose – Bernard Morris: 17/29, 217 yards, 6 TD, 2 INT
- Dallas – Dan Raudabaugh: 14/22, 193 yards, 4 TD, 1 INT

Rushing

- San Jose – Mervin Brookins: 1 att, 7 yards
- Dallas – Derrick Ross: 10 att, 67 yards, 3 TD

Receiving

- San Jose – Ben Nelson: 8 rec, 132 yards, 4 TD
- Dallas – Anthony Jones: 6 rec, 95 yards, 3 TD

=== Week 15: at Iowa Barnstormers ===
Week 15: Dallas Vigilantes at Iowa Barnstormers – Game summary

| Quarter | 1 | 2 | 3 | 4 | Total |
|---|---|---|---|---|---|
| Vigilantes | 20 | 14 | 7 | 24 | 65 |
| Barnstormers | 7 | 13 | 15 | 20 | 55 |

at Wells Fargo Arena, Des Moines, Iowa

- Date: June 18
- Game time: 7:05 p.m. CDT
- Game attendance: 8,059
- Referee: Larry Smith
- Recap

Game information

1st quarter

- Dallas – (14:19) DeAndrew Rubin 44-yard pass from Dan Raudabaugh (Remy Hamilton kick failed), Dallas 6–0
- Dallas – (7:38) DeAndrew Rubin 13-yard pass from Dan Raudabaugh (Remy Hamilton kick), Dallas 13–0
- Iowa – (6:22) Todd Blythe 36-yard pass from Brad Banks (Nick Pertuit kick), Dallas 13–7
- Dallas – (0:00) Anthony Jones 11-yard pass from Dan Raudabaugh (Remy Hamilton kick), Dallas 20–7

2nd quarter

- Iowa – (11:48) Brad Banks 1-yard run (Nick Pertuit kick failed), Dallas 20–13
- Dallas – (8:53) Matt Fields 28-yard pass from Dan Raudabaugh (Remy Hamilton kick), Dallas 27–13
- Dallas – (0:26) Anthony Jones 10-yard pass from Dan Raudabaugh (Remy Hamilton kick), Dallas 34–13
- Iowa – (0:03) Todd Blythe 22-yard pass from Brad Banks (Nick Pertuit kick), Dallas 34–20

3rd quarter

- Iowa – (10:46) Marquis Hamilton 5-yard pass from Brad Banks (Nick Pertuit kick), Dallas 34–27
- Iowa – (9:33) Team safety, Dallas 34–29
- Iowa – (3:06) Brad Banks 1-yard run (Nick Pertuit kick failed), Iowa 35–34
- Dallas – (0:46) Derrick Ross 9-yard run (Remy Hamilton kick), Dallas 41–35

4th quarter

- Dallas – (14:05) Derrick Ross 10-yard run (Remy Hamilton kick), Dallas 48–35
- Dallas – (12:47) Anthony Jones 12-yard pass from Dan Raudabaugh (Remy Hamilton kick), Dallas 55–35
- Iowa – (11:13) Jesse Schmidt 16-yard pass from Brad Banks (Nick Pertuit kick), Dallas 55–42
- Dallas – (7:52) Remy Hamilton 24-yard field goal, Dallas 58–42
- Iowa – (5:46) Rodney Filer 1-yard run (Brad Banks pass failed), Dallas 58–48
- Dallas – (4:40) Mike Aguayo 13-yard pass from Dan Raudabaugh (Remy Hamilton kick), Dallas 65–48
- Iowa – (1:51) Jesse Schmidt 10-yard pass from Brad Banks (Nick Pertuit kick), Dallas 65–55

Passing

- Dallas – Dan Raudabaugh: 16/26, 254 yards, 7 TD
- Iowa – Russ Michna: 24/36, 363 yards, 5 TD, 1 INT

Rushing

- Dallas – Derrick Ross: 13 att, 67 yards, 2 TD
- Iowa – Brad Banks: 6 att, 9 yards, 2 TD

Receiving

- Dallas – DeAndrew Rubin: 4 rec, 106 yards, 2 TD
- Iowa – Jesse Schmidt: 10 rec, 150 yards, 2 TD

=== Week 16: at Tulsa Talons ===
Week 16: Dallas Vigilantes at Tulsa Talons – Game summary

| Quarter | 1 | 2 | 3 | 4 | Total |
|---|---|---|---|---|---|
| Vigilantes | 21 | 14 | 6 | 14 | 55 |
| Talons | 7 | 7 | 20 | 14 | 48 |

at BOK Center, Tulsa, Oklahoma

- Date: June 25
- Game time: 7:00 p.m. CDT
- Referee: Shawn Hochuli
- Recap

Game information

1st quarter

- Dallas – (9:42) Anthony Jones 4-yard pass from Dan Raudabaugh (Remy Hamilton kick), Dallas 7–0
- Tulsa – (6:17) Brandon Copeland 15-yard pass from Justin Allgood (Juan Bongarra kick), Tied 7–7
- Dallas – (5:23) Chris LeFlore 55-yard kickoff return (Remy Hamilton kick), Dallas 14–7
- Dallas – (1:53) Matt Fields 10-yard pass from Dan Raudabaugh (Remy Hamilton kick), Dallas 21–7

2nd quarter

- Tulsa – (12:20) J.J. Payne 3-yard run (Juan Bongarra kick), Dallas 21–14
- Dallas – (7:38) Anthony Jones 6-yard pass from Dan Raudabaugh (Remy Hamilton kick), Dallas 28–14
- Dallas – (0:35) Matt Fields 1-yard pass from Dan Raudabaugh (Remy Hamilton kick), Dallas 35–14

3rd quarter

- Tulsa – (13:10) Matt Bassuener 1-yard run (Juan Bongarra kick), Dallas 35–21
- Dallas – (9:13) Anthony Jones 8-yard pass from Dan Raudabaugh (Remy Hamilton kick failed), Dallas 41–21
- Tulsa – (3:34) Troy McBroom 4-yard pass from Justin Allgood (Juan Bongarra kick failed), Dallas 41–27
- Tulsa – (0:12) Troy McBroom 9-yard pass from Justin Allgood (Juan Bongarra kick), Dallas 41–34

4th quarter

- Dallas – (13:57) Anthony Jones 41-yard pass from Dan Raudabaugh (Remy Hamilton kick), Dallas 48–34
- Dallas – (8:00) Anthony Jones 8-yard pass from Dan Raudabaugh (Remy Hamilton kick), Dallas 55–34
- Tulsa – (6:47) Trent Shelton 45-yard pass from Justin Allgood (Juan Bongarra kick), Dallas 55–41
- Tulsa – (0:55) Brandon Copeland 10-yard pass from Justin Allgood (Juan Bongarra kick), Dallas 55–48

Passing

- Dallas – Dan Raudabaugh: 24/37, 261 yards, 7 TD, 1 INT
- Tulsa – Justin Allgood: 25/52, 296 yards, 5 TD

Rushing

- Dallas – Derrick Ross: 8 att, 23 yards
- Tulsa – J.J. Payne: 2 att, 7 yards, 1 TD

Receiving

- Dallas – Anthony Jones: 14 rec, 162 yards, 5 TD
- Tulsa – Trent Shelton: 5 rec, 104 yards, 1 TD

=== Week 17: vs. Philadelphia Soul ===
Week 17: Philadelphia Soul at Dallas Vigilantes – Game summary

| Quarter | 1 | 2 | 3 | 4 | Total |
|---|---|---|---|---|---|
| Soul | 14 | 6 | 14 | 7 | 41 |
| Vigilantes | 20 | 14 | 17 | 7 | 58 |

at American Airlines Center, Dallas, Texas

- Date: July 2
- Game time: 7:30 p.m. CDT
- Game attendance: 8,957
- Referee: Chris Snead
- Recap

Game information

1st quarter

- Dallas – (12:35) Derrick Ross 2-yard run (Remy Hamilton kick), Dallas 7–0
- Dallas – (10:02) DeAndrew Rubin 31-yard pass from Dan Raudabaugh (Remy Hamilton kick failed), Dallas 13–0
- Philadelphia – (5:37) Syvelle Newton 12-yard pass from Ryan Vena (Jon Striefsky kick), Dallas 13–7
- Dallas – (4:30) Chris LeFlore 54-yard kickoff return (Remy Hamilton kick), Dallas 20–7
- Philadelphia – (0:11) Ty Nsekle 16-yard pass from Syvelle Newton (Jon Striefsky kick), Dallas 20–14

2nd quarter

- Dallas – (12:17) Jason Harmon 26-yard interception return (Remy Hamilton kick), Dallas 27–14
- Philadelphia – (4:09) Larry Brackins 6-yard pass from Ryan Vena (Jon Striefsky kick failed), Dallas 27–20
- Dallas – (1:17) Derrick Ross 2-yard run (Remy Hamilton kick), Dallas 34–20

3rd quarter

- Dallas – (12:30) Derrick Ross 2-yard run (Remy Hamilton kick), Dallas 41–20
- Philadelphia – (9:47) Donovan Morgan 6-yard pass from Ryan Vena (Jon Striefsky kick), Dallas 41–27
- Dallas – (4:47) Remy Hamilton 19-yard field goal, Dallas 44–27
- Philadelphia – (2:28) Donovan Morgan 27-yard pass from Ryan Vena (Jon Striefsky kick), Dallas 44–34
- Dallas – (0:47) Anthony Jones 10-yard pass from Dan Raudabaugh (Remy Hamilton kick), Dallas 51–34

4th quarter

- Dallas – (9:44) Matt Fields 28-yard pass from Dan Raudabaugh (Remy Hamilton kick), Dallas 58–34
- Philadelphia – (8:16) Donovan Morgan 29-yard pass from Ryan Vena (Jon Striefsky kick), Dallas 58–41

Passing

- Philadelphia – Ryan Vena: 22/38, 354 yards, 5 TD, 3 INT
- Dallas – Dan Raudabaugh: 20/29, 253 yards, 3 TD, 1 INT

Rushing

- Philadelphia – No attempts
- Dallas – Derrick Ross: 10 att, 26 yards, 3 TD

Receiving

- Philadelphia – Donovan Morgan: 8 rec, 135 yards, 3 TD
- Dallas – Anthony Jones: 9 rec, 115 yards, 1 TD

=== Week 18: at Jacksonville Sharks ===
Week 18: Dallas Vigilantes at Jacksonville Sharks – Game summary

| Quarter | 1 | 2 | 3 | 4 | Total |
|---|---|---|---|---|---|
| Vigilantes | 14 | 27 | 21 | 13 | 75 |
| Sharks | 7 | 29 | 19 | 15 | 70 |

at Jacksonville Veterans Memorial Arena, Jacksonville, Florida

- Date: July 9
- Game time: 6:00 p.m. CDT
- Game attendance: 11,153
- Referee: Kevin Stine
- Recap

Game information

1st quarter

- Dallas – (9:03) Derrick Ross 3-yard run (Remy Hamilton kick), Dallas 7–0
- Dallas – (5:32) Anthony Jones 29-yard pass from Dan Raudabaugh (Remy Hamilton kick), Dallas 14–0
- Jacksonville – (1:23) Jeff Hughley 43-yard pass from Aaron Garcia (Marco Capozzoli kick), Dallas 14–7

2nd quarter

- Jacksonville – (13:21) JaVonte Holmes 28-yard interception return (Marco Capozzoli kick), Tied 14–14
- Dallas – (11:03) Dan Raudabaugh 21-yard pass from Dan Raudabaugh (Remy Hamilton kick), Dallas 21–14
- Jacksonville – (7:09) Kirby Griffin 2-yard run (Marco Capozzoli kick), Tied 21–21
- Dallas – (4:03) Anthony Jones 20-yard pass from Dan Raudabaugh (Remy Hamilton kick), Dallas 28–21
- Jacksonville – (1:46) Jeff Hughley 11-yard pass from Aaron Garcia (Marco Capozzoli kick failed), Dallas 28–27
- Dallas – (0:46) Derrick Ross 1-yard run (Remy Hamilton kick), Dallas 35–27
- Jacksonville – (0:24) Jeff Hughley 24-yard pass from Aaron Garcia (Marco Capozzoli kick), Dallas 35–34
- Dallas – (0:00) Derrick Ross 1-yard run (Remy Hamilton kick blocked), Dallas 41–34
- Jacksonville – (0:00) Jerry Brown PAT return, Dallas 41–36

3rd quarter

- Dallas – (12:47) DeAndrew Rubin 26-yard pass from Dan Raudabaugh (Remy Hamilton kick), Dallas 48–36
- Jacksonville – (9:46) Jomo Wilson 4-yard pass from Aaron Garcia (Marco Capozzoli kick failed), Dallas 48–42
- Dallas – (6:00) Anthony Jones 8-yard pass from Dan Raudabaugh (Remy Hamilton kick), Dallas 55–42
- Jacksonville – (2:53) Jomo Wilson 14-yard pass from Aaron Garcia (Marco Capozzoli kick), Dallas 55–49
- Dallas – (1:32) Anthony Jones 8-yard pass from Dan Raudabaugh (Remy Hamilton kick), Dallas 62–49
- Jacksonville – (0:11) Jomo Wilson 1-yard run (Jeff Hughley rush failed), Dallas 62–55

4th quarter

- Jacksonville – (10:18) Jeff Hughley 14-yard pass from Aaron Garcia (Marco Capozzoli kick), Tied 62–62
- Jacksonville – (9:13) Richard Clebert safety, Jacksonville 64–62
- Dallas – (4:39) DeAndrew Rubin 23-yard pass from Dan Raudabaugh (Remy Hamilton kick), Dallas 69–64
- Dallas – (1:51) Anthony Jones 16-yard pass from Dan Raudabaugh (Dan Raudabaugh pass failed), Dallas 75–64
- Jacksonville – (0:27) Jomo Wilson 8-yard pass from Aaron Garcia (Aaron Garcia pass failed), Dallas 75–70

Passing

- Dallas – Dan Raudabaugh: 29/39, 365 yards, 8 TD, 1 INT
- Jacksonville – Aaron Garcia: 21/35, 275 yards, 7 TD, 3 INT

Rushing

- Dallas – Derrick Ross: 10 att, 15 yards, 3 TD
- Jacksonville – Kirby Griffin: 3 att, 16 yards, 1 TD

Receiving

- Dallas – Anthony Jones: 17 rec, 208 yards, 5 TD
- Jacksonville – Jeff Hughley: 9 rec, 138 yards, 4 TD

=== Week 19: vs. Chicago Rush ===
Week 19: Chicago Rush at Dallas Vigilantes – Game summary

| Quarter | 1 | 2 | 3 | 4 | Total |
|---|---|---|---|---|---|
| Rush | 14 | 7 | 14 | 18 | 53 |
| Vigilantes | 23 | 14 | 0 | 7 | 44 |

at American Airlines Center, Dallas, Texas

- Date: July 16
- Game time: 7:30 p.m. CDT
- Game attendance: 11,553
- Referee: Scott Vaughn
- Recap

Game information

1st quarter

- Dallas – (11:27) Anthony Jones 33-yard pass from Dan Raudabaugh (Remy Hamilton kick), Dallas 7–0
- Chicago – (10:11) Charles Dillon 41-yard pass from J.J. Raterink (Chris Gould kick), Tied 7–7
- Dallas – (8:27) DeAndrew Rubin 37-yard pass from Dan Raudabaugh (Remy Hamilton kick), Dallas 14–7
- Dallas – (5:22) Larry Dibbles safety, Dallas 16–7
- Dallas – (4:12) John Ferguson 15-yard pass from Dan Raudabaugh (Remy Hamilton kick), Dallas 23–7
- Chicago – (1:38) Charles Dillon 5-yard pass from J.J. Raterink (Chris Gould kick), Dallas 23–14

2nd quarter

- Dallas – (12:55) Derrick Ross 4-yard run (Remy Hamilton kick), Dallas 30–14
- Chicago – (9:15) Reggie Gray 17-yard pass from J.J. Raterink (Chris Gould kick), Dallas 30–21
- Dallas – (3:13) Derrick Ross 1-yard run (Remy Hamilton kick), Dallas 37–21

3rd quarter

- Chicago – (12:21) Derek Lee 18-yard pass from J.J. Raterink (Chris Gould kick), Dallas 37–28
- Chicago – (3;36) Johnie Kirton 3-yard run (Chris Gould kick), Dallas 37–35

4th quarter

- Dallas – (14:26) John Ferguson 6-yard pass from Dan Raudabaugh (Remy Hamilton kick), Dallas 44–35
- Chicago – (12:01) Reggie Gray 24-yard pass from J.J. Raterink (Charles Dillon rush), Dallas 44–43
- Chicago – (2:28) Reggie Gray 47-yard pass from J.J. Raterink (J.J. Raterink pass), Chicago 51–44
- Chicago – (1:28) Team safety, Chicago 53–44

Passing

- Chicago – J.J. Raterink: 19/29, 294 yards, 6 TD
- Dallas – Darnell Kennedy: 25/45, 337 yards, 4 TD

Rushing

- Chicago – Johnie Kirton: 8 att, 18 yards, 1 TD
- Dallas – Derrick Ross: 9 att, 30 yards, 2 TD

Receiving

- Chicago – Reggie Gray: 6 rec, 126 yards, 3 TD
- Dallas – Anthony Jones: 11 rec, 173 yards, 1 TD

=== Week 20: vs. Arizona Rattlers ===
Week 20: Arizona Rattlers at Dallas Vigilantes – Game summary

| Quarter | 1 | 2 | 3 | 4 | Total |
|---|---|---|---|---|---|
| Rattlers | 14 | 14 | 7 | 20 | 55 |
| Vigilantes | 0 | 21 | 14 | 14 | 49 |

at American Airlines Center, Dallas, Texas

- Date: July 23
- Game time: 7:30 p.m. CDT
- Game attendance: 12,866
- Referee: David Cutaia
- Recap

Game information

1st quarter

- Arizona – (10:12) Chris Jackson 5-yard pass from Nick Davila (Jason Witczak kick), Arizona 7–0
- Arizona – (3:37) Chris Jackson 8-yard pass from Nick Davila (Jason Witczak kick), Arizona 14–0

2nd quarter

- Dallas – (10:43) Derrick Ross 1-yard run (Remy Hamilton kick), Arizona 14–7
- Dallas – (6:37) Derrick Ross 3-yard run (Remy Hamilton kick), Tied 14–14
- Arizona – (2:11) Kerry Reed 8-yard pass from Nick Davila (Jason Witczak kick), Arizona 21–14
- Dallas – (0:32) Derrick Ross 1-yard run (Remy Hamilton kick), Tied 21–21
- Arizona – (0:15) Chris Jackson 7-yard pass from Nick Davila (Jason Witczak kick), Arizona 28–21

3rd quarter

- Dallas – (10:50) R.J. Jackson 24-yard pass from Luke Drone (Remy Hamilton kick), Tied 28–28
- Arizona – (6:52) Chris Jackson 4-yard pass from Nick Davila (Jason Witczak kick), Arizona 35–28
- Dallas – (1:48) R.J. Jackson 4-yard pass from Luke Drone (Remy Hamilton kick), Tied 35–35

4th quarter

- Arizona – (11:52) Kerry Reed 5-yard pass from Nick Davila (Jason Witczak kick), Arizona 42–35
- Arizona – (5:33) Glen Fox 29-yard pass from Nick Davila (Jason Witczak kick), Arizona 49–35
- Dallas – (0:43) R.J. Jackson 2-yard pass from Luke Drone (Remy Hamilton kick), Arizona 49–42
- Arizona – (0:38) Chris Jackson 16-yard pass from Nick Davila (Jason Witczak kick failed), Arizona 55–42
- Dallas – (0:30) DeAndrew Rubin 46-yard kickoff return (Remy Hamilton kick), Arizona 55–49

Passing

- Arizona – Nick Davila: 26/35, 253 yards, 8 TD
- Dallas – Luke Drone: 17/27, 147 yards, 3 TD, 1 INT

Rushing

- Arizona – Nick Davila: 2 att, 17 yards
- Dallas – Derrick Ross: 9 att, 26 yards, 3 TD

Receiving

- Arizona – Chris Jackson: 7 rec, 71 yards, 5 TD
- Dallas – Anthony Jones: 10 rec, 133 yards

== Playoffs ==
=== National Conference Semifinals: at (2) Chicago Rush ===
National Conference Semifinals: Dallas Vigilantes at Chicago Rush – Game summary

| Quarter | 1 | 2 | 3 | 4 | Total |
|---|---|---|---|---|---|
| (3) Vigilantes | 10 | 20 | 14 | 7 | 51 |
| (2) Rush | 7 | 20 | 7 | 20 | 54 |

at Allstate Arena, Rosemont, Illinois

- Date: July 29
- Game time: 7:30 p.m. CDT
- Game attendance: 4,489
- Referee: Shawn Hochuli
- Recap

Game information

1st quarter

- Chicago – (13:17) Reggie Gray 17-yard pass from J.J. Raterink (Chris Gould kick), Chicago 7–0
- Dallas – (9:53) Anthony Jones 10-yard pass from Dan Raudabaugh (Remy Hamilton kick), Tied 7–7
- Dallas – (2:29) Remy Hamilton 18-yard field goal, Dallas 10–7

2nd quarter

- Chicago – (14:09) Johnie Kirton 2-yard run (Chris Gould kick), Chicago 14–10
- Dallas – (13:01) Matt Fields 10-yard pass from Dan Raudabaugh (Remy Hamilton kick failed), Dallas 16–14
- Chicago – (9:26) Shatone Powers 22-yard pass from J.J. Raterink (Chris Gould kick failed), Chicago 20–16
- Dallas – (6:39) Matt Fields 21-yard pass from Dan Raudabaugh (Remy Hamilton kick), Dallas 23–20
- Chicago – (2:21) J.J. Raterink 8-yard run (Chris Gould kick), Chicago 27–23
- Dallas – (0:02) DeAndrew Rubin 2-yard pass from Dan Raudabaugh (Remy Hamilton kick), Dallas 30–27

3rd quarter

- Dallas – (11:39) Anthony Jones 13-yard pass from Dan Raudabaugh (Remy Hamilton kick), Dallas 37–27
- Chicago – (5:49) Charles Dillon 13-yard pass from J.J. Raterink (Chris Gould kick), Dallas 37–34
- Dallas – (0:51) Anthony Jones 6-yard pass from Dan Raudabaugh (Remy Hamilton kick), Dallas 44–34

4th quarter

- Chicago – (12:54) Reggie Gray 4-yard pass from J.J. Raterink (Chris Gould kick), Dallas 44–41
- Dallas – (9:10) Derrick Ross 3-yard run (Remy Hamilton kick), Dallas 51–41
- Chicago – (4:24) Charles Dillon 5-yard pass from J.J. Raterink (Chris Gould kick), Dallas 51–48
- Chicago – (3:46) Derek Lee 38-yard pass from J.J. Raterink (Chris Gould kick failed), Chicago 54–51

Passing

- Dallas – Dan Raudabaugh: 25/36, 256 yards, 6 TD
- Chicago – J.J. Raterink: 23/31, 287 yards, 6 TD

Rushing

- Dallas – Derrick Ross: 10 att, 50 yards, 1 TD
- Chicago – J.J. Raterink: 4 att, 22 yards, 1 TD

Receiving

- Dallas – Anthony Jones: 11 rec, 112 yards, 3 TD
- Chicago – Reggie Gray: 9 rec, 105 yards, 2 TD
