= 2011 Arena Football League season =

- League: Arena Football League
- Sport: arena football
- Duration: March 9 – August 12

Regular season
- Season champions: Arizona Rattlers
- Season MVP: Nick Davila, ARZ

League postseason
- American Conference champions: Jacksonville Sharks
- American Conference runners-up: Georgia Force
- National Conference champions: Arizona Rattlers
- National Conference runners-up: Chicago Rush

ArenaBowl XXIV
- Champions: Jacksonville Sharks
- Runners-up: Arizona Rattlers
- Finals MVP: Aaron Garcia, JAX

AFL seasons
- ← 2010 2012 →

American: East, South
National: West, Central

The 2011 Arena Football League season was the 24th season in the history of the league. The regular season began on March 11, 2011 and ended on July 23, 2011. The Jacksonville Sharks, in their second year of existence, defeated the Arizona Rattlers 73–70 in ArenaBowl XXIV on August 12, 2011 to conclude the playoffs.

== League business ==
=== Teams ===
Three franchises that competed in the 2008 season, the Philadelphia Soul, San Jose SaberCats, and Kansas City Command (formerly the Kansas City Brigade), returned to competition in the 2011 season, after an announcement made on June 19, 2010.

Two teams that competed in 2010 relocated and have assumed the history of former AFL franchises. It was announced on August 21, 2010 that the Alabama Vipers would become the Georgia Force, and on September 14, 2010 it was revealed that the Bossier–Shreveport Battle Wings would become the New Orleans VooDoo.

The Milwaukee Iron officially changed its name to the Milwaukee Mustangs on January 27, 2011, taking the name of the original franchise.

The city of Pittsburgh, Pennsylvania was awarded an expansion team on August 20, 2010. The team, named the Pittsburgh Power, was the first AFL team to call Pittsburgh home since the Pittsburgh Gladiators, one of the league's four original franchises. The Gladiators moved to Tampa, Florida and became the Tampa Bay Storm after the 1990 season.

The only team that did not return from the 2010 season was the Oklahoma City Yard Dawgz. Owner Phil Miller made the announcement on October 21, 2010, citing an inability to find minority investors as one reason for the decision to not compete.

=== Realignment ===
With several teams relocating, returning, or leaving, the AFL announced the divisional alignment for 2011 on October 21, 2010. Both conferences each had nine teams placed in two divisions.

Conference	Division	Teams
American	East	Cleveland Gladiators, Milwaukee Mustangs, Philadelphia Soul, Pittsburgh Power
American	South	Georgia Force, Jacksonville Sharks, New Orleans VooDoo, Orlando Predators, Tampa Bay Storm
National	Central	Chicago Rush, Dallas Vigilantes, Iowa Barnstormers, Kansas City Command, Tulsa Talons
National	West	Arizona Rattlers, San Jose SaberCats, Spokane Shock, Utah Blaze

== Regular season schedule ==
Each team played an 18-game regular season with two bye weeks over the course of 20 weeks, making it the longest schedule in the history of the league. The first game of the season was played on March 11, 2011. The Pittsburgh Power began their inaugural season against the Philadelphia Soul, who played their first game since winning ArenaBowl XXII in 2008.

On July 9, the Spokane Shock and Utah Blaze played in a game billed as the "Joe Albi Stadium Summer Classic". The game was played outdoors at Joe Albi Stadium under normal arena football rules.

== Regular season standings ==
American Conference
East Division
Team	W	L	PCT	PF	PA	DIV	CON	Home	Away
^{(2)} Cleveland Gladiators	10	8	.556	904	842	4–2	6–5	7–2	3–6
Pittsburgh Power	9	9	.500	870	972	4–2	5–6	5–4	4–5
Milwaukee Mustangs	7	11	.389	872	867	1–5	3–8	4–5	3–6
Philadelphia Soul	6	12	.333	914	969	3–3	5–6	4–5	2–7
South Division
Team	W	L	PCT	PF	PA	DIV	CON	Home	Away
^{(1)} Jacksonville Sharks	14	4	.778	1158	908	8–0	12–0	8–1	6–3
^{(3)} Georgia Force^{[a]}	11	7	.611	1007	931	5–3	7–5	5–4	6–3
^{(4)} Orlando Predators	11	7	.611	1001	933	4–4	8–4	6–3	5–4
Tampa Bay Storm	7	11	.389	802	993	2–6	4–8	4–5	3–6
New Orleans VooDoo	3	15	.167	826	1017	1–7	2–10	0–9	3–6
National Conference
Central Division
Team	W	L	PCT	PF	PA	DIV	CON	Home	Away
^{(2)} Chicago Rush	13	5	.722	957	833	6–2	9–3	7–2	6–3
^{(3)} Dallas Vigilantes	11	7	.611	1061	1007	6–2	7–5	6–3	5–4
Tulsa Talons	8	10	.444	894	899	3–5	4–7	4–5	4–5
Kansas City Command	6	12	.333	854	974	3–5	4–9	4–4	2–7
Iowa Barnstormers	5	13	.278	916	1116	2–6	5–7	4–5	1–8
West Division
Team	W	L	PCT	PF	PA	DIV	CON	Home	Away
^{(1)} Arizona Rattlers	16	2	.889	1114	836	5–1	9–2	8–1	8–1
^{(4)} Spokane Shock^{[b]}	9	9	.500	1057	1027	3–3	6–5	7–2	2–7
Utah Blaze	9	9	.500	1082	1117	2–4	4–7	7–2	2–7
San Jose SaberCats	7	11	.389	1022	1080	2–4	4–7	6–3	1–8

Eight teams qualify for the playoffs: four teams from each conference, of which two are division champions and the other two have the best records of the teams remaining.

- Green indicates clinched playoff berth
- Blue indicates division champion
- Gray indicates division champion and conference's best record

=== Tie-breakers ===
- ^{a} Georgia clinched the No. 3 seed in the American Conference based on their greater point differential in head-to-head competition with Orlando.
- ^{b} Spokane clinched the No. 4 seed in the National Conference based on their greater point differential in head-to-head competition with Utah.

== Statistics ==
Final statistics

=== Passing ===
Player	Comp.	Att.	Comp%	Yards	TD's	INT's	Rating
Nick Davila, ARZ	427	604	70.7%	4,916	117	10	127.6
Aaron Garcia, JAX	402	562	71.5%	4,953	116	17	125.4
Nick Hill, ORL	387	578	67.0%	4,758	97	17	119.5
Tommy Grady, UTA	383	583	65.7%	4,368	107	12	119.1
Dan Raudabaugh, DAL	360	587	64.6%	4,741	90	17	118.3

=== Rushing ===
Player	Car.	Yards	Avg.	TD's	Long
Derrick Ross, DAL	167	622	3.7	39	37
Nick Hill, ORL	391	275	4.9	9	39
Johnnie Kirton, CHI	366	209	3.2	14	15
Bobby Reid, TUL	31	314	10.1	13	39
Bernard Morris, PIT	46	312	6.8	4	43

=== Receiving ===
Player	Rec.	Yards	YPG	TD's	Long
Anthony Jones, DAL	171	2,232	124.0	42	43
Donovan Morgan, PHI	168	1,959	122.4	37	46
Jesse Schmidt, IOW	130	2,171	120.6	55	43
Troy McBroom, TUL	121	1,747	116.5	31	44
Rod Windsor, ARZ	156	1,830	114.4	36	44

== Awards ==
=== All-Arena team ===
Offense
Position	First team	Second team
Quarterback	Aaron Garcia, Jacksonville	Nick Davila, Arizona
Fullback	Derrick Ross, Dallas	Chad Cook, San Jose
Center	Randy Degg, Jacksonville	Brennan Carvalho, Arizona
Offensive lineman	Adam Tadisch, Cleveland; Richard Ranglin, Kansas City	Mark Lewis, San Jose; Devin Clark, Arizona
Wide receiver	Rod Windsor, Arizona; Anthony Jones, Dallas; Jesse Schmidt, Iowa	Maurice Purify, Georgia; Donovan Morgan, Philadelphia; Reggie Gray, Chicago

Defense
Position	First team	Second team
Defensive lineman	Anttaj Hawthorne, Arizona; Tim McGill, Tampa Bay; Caesar Rayford, Utah	Dusty Bear, Dallas; Derrick Summers, Jacksonville; Mike Lewis, Utah
Middle linebacker	Cliff Dukes, Tampa Bay	Tim Cheatwood, Cleveland
Jack linebacker	Kelvin Morris, Chicago	Marlon Moye-Moore, Orlando
Defensive back	Rayshaun Kizer, Orlando; Micheaux Robinson, Jacksonville; Vic Hall, Chicago	Andre Jones, Milwaukee; Virgil Gray, Arizona; J.C. Neal, Tulsa

Special teams
Position	First team	Second team
Kicker	Carlos Martinez, Georgia	Fabrizio Scaccia, Arizona
Kick returner	PJ Berry, New Orleans	Virgil Gray, Arizona

=== All-Ironman team ===
On August 8, 2011, the All-Ironman team was announced, with P. J. Berry of the New Orleans VooDoo being named the Ironman of the Year.

Player	Position	Team
P. J. Berry	WR/KR	New Orleans VooDoo
Reggie Gray	WR/KR	Chicago Rush
Jeff Hughley	WR/KR	Jacksonville Sharks
C.J. Johnson	WR/KR	Georgia Force
Marlon Moye-Moore	FB/LB	Orlando Predators
Jason Simpson	DB/KR	Chicago Rush

== Playoffs ==
Conference Semifinals
1	Jacksonville	63
4	Orlando	48
American Conference
2	Cleveland	41
3	Georgia	50
1	Arizona	62
4	Spokane	33
National Conference
2	Chicago	54
3	Dallas	51

Conference Championship
1	Jacksonville	64
3	Georgia	55
1	Arizona	54
2	Chicago	48

ArenaBowl XXIV
A1	Jacksonville	73
N1	Arizona	70

=== Conference semifinals ===
Conference	Date	Kickoff	Away	Home	Final score	Game site	Recap
American	July 29	8:00 p.m. EDT	Orlando Predators	Jacksonville Sharks	Jacksonville, 63–48	Jacksonville Veterans Memorial Arena	
National	July 29	8:30 p.m. EDT	Dallas Vigilantes	Chicago Rush	Chicago, 54–51	Allstate Arena	
National	July 29	10:00 p.m. EDT	Spokane Shock	Arizona Rattlers	Arizona, 62–33	US Airways Center	
American	July 31	3:00 p.m. EDT	Georgia Force	Cleveland Gladiators	Georgia, 50–41	Quicken Loans Arena	

=== Conference finals ===
Conference	Date	Kickoff	Away	Home	Final score	Game site	Recap
National	August 6	10:00 p.m. EDT	Chicago Rush	Arizona Rattlers	Arizona, 54–48	US Airways Center	
American	August 8	8:00 p.m. EDT	Georgia Force	Jacksonville Sharks	Jacksonville, 64–55	Jacksonville Veterans Memorial Arena	

=== ArenaBowl XXIV ===
Date	Kickoff	Away	Home	Final score	Game site	Recap
August 12	8:30 p.m. EDT	Jacksonville Sharks	Arizona Rattlers	Jacksonville, 73–70	US Airways Center	
