= Jesse Schmidt =

American football player (born 1983)

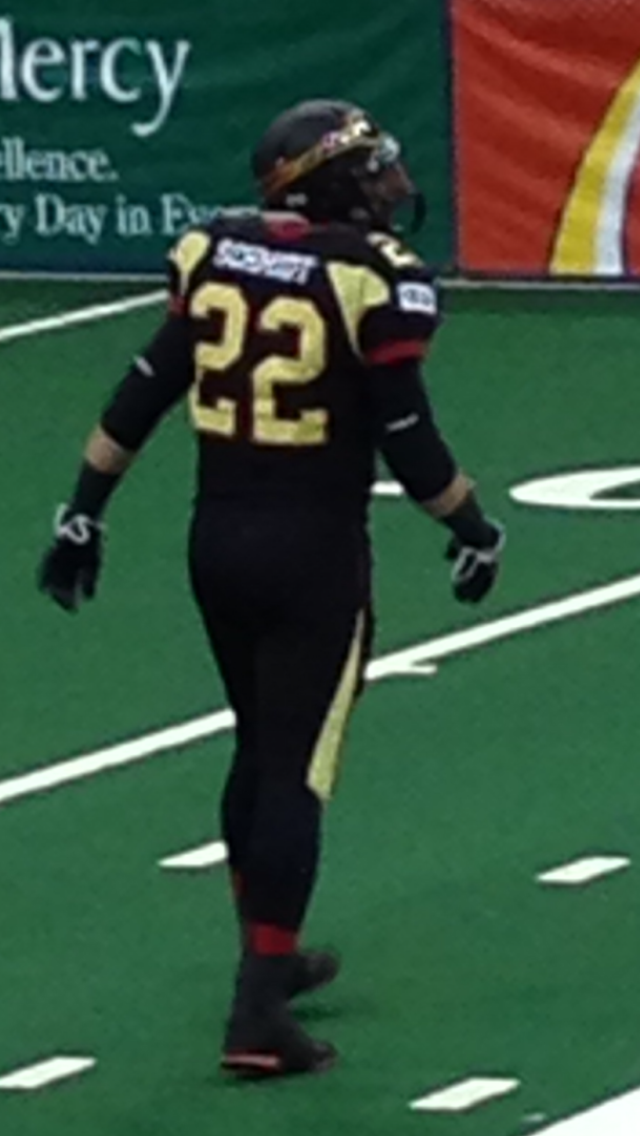
- Schmidt with the Barnstormers in 2013

No. 22
- Position: Wide receiver

Personal information
- Born: June 23, 1983 (age 43); Laurens, Iowa, U.S.
- Listed height: 6 ft 3 in (1.91 m)
- Listed weight: 220 lb (100 kg)

Career information
- College: Buena Vista University
- NFL draft: 2006: undrafted

Career history
- Quad City Steamwheelers (2007–2009); Iowa Barnstormers (2010–2013)

Awards and highlights
- Buena Vista career receptions, receiving touchdowns, and yards record holder.; IIAC All-Iowa Conference (2005); American Conference All-af2 WR (2009); Iowa Barnstormers Most Valuable Player (2011); 2× First Team All-Arena WR (2011, 2012); Cutters Wide Receiver Of The Year (2012)

Career AFL statistics
- Receptions: 529
- Yards: 6,840
- Touchdowns: 162
- Stats at ArenaFan.com

Jesse Schmidt (born June 23, 1983) is an American former professional football wide receiver.

Schmidt was a standout member of the Buena Vista University football team where he set records for catches in a single game (11), most catches in a career (132), most receiving yards in 10 games (1,008), most receiving yards in a career (2,314), twice breaking the most touchdowns in a season (11 & 12), and most receiving touchdowns in a career (33). After a standout career at Buena Vista, Schmidt became a star player at the af2 level for the Quad City Steamwheelers, earning American Conference All-af2 wide receiver honors in 2009. In 2010, the Iowa Barnstormers returned in the newly re-structured Arena Football League, and Schmidt was assigned to their roster. Schmidt was the leading receiver for the Barnstormers from 2010 through 2012, twice earning First Team All-Arena wide receiver honors, and winning the Cutter's Receiver of the Year Award in 2012.

== College career ==
Schmidt attended Buena Vista University in Storm Lake, Iowa, where he was a member of the football team. Schmidt was a standout member of the football team where he set records for catches in a single game (11), most catches in a career (132), most receiving yards in 10 games (1,008), most receiving yards in a career (2,314), twice breaking the most touchdowns in a season (11 & 12), and most receiving touchdowns in a career (33).

== Professional career ==
=== Quad City Steamwheelers ===
Schmidt appeared in three games for the af2's Quad City Steamwheelers. Recorded 8 catches for 131 yards and 3 touchdowns. In 2008, Played for the Quad City Steamwheelers and recorded 131 catches for 1799 yards with 41 touchdowns. In 2009 Schmidt played, again, with the Quad City Steamwheelers. He recorded 172 catches for 2390 yards with 58 touchdowns.

=== Iowa Barnstormers ===
Schmidt was assigned to the Iowa Barnstormers of the Arena Football League in 2010 when he received the opportunity to move up level. He caught 116 passes for 1621 yards with 28 touchdown catches. In his second year with the Barnstormers, Jesse Schmidt broke all the receiving records in team history. He caught 168 passes for 2171 yards and brought in 55 touchdown passes. He also unanimously won the Barnstormers MVP award.

In 2012, Schmidt returned to the Barnstormers and was rejoined with former Steamwheelers' teammate, J. J. Raterink, and had the most outstanding season of his career, winning the Cutter's Receiver of the Year Award. Schmidt finished the year with 172 receptions for 2,218 yards and 59 touchdowns. On April 11, 2013, he signed a deal with the Barnstormers keeping him in Iowa for another three years.

=== Career receiving statistics ===
Year	Team	Games	Rec	Yards	Y/R	TDs
2007	Quad City Steamwheelers	16	8	131	16.4	3
2008	Quad City Steamwheelers	16	131	1,799	13.7	41
2009	Quad City Steamwheelers	16	172	2,390	13.9	58
2010	Iowa Barnstormers	16	116	1,621	14.0	28
2011	Iowa Barnstormers	18	168	2,171	12.9	55
2012	Iowa Barnstormers	18	172	2,218	12.9	58
2013	Iowa Barnstormers	14	74	835	11.3	22

== Awards and honors ==
- Iowa Barnstormers Most Valuable Player (MVP) -2011
- First Team All-Arena WR -2011
- Cutters Wide Receiver Of The Year -2012
- First Team All-Arena WR -2012
