= 2011 Georgia Force season =

Arena Football League team season

- Head coach: Dean Cokinos
- Home stadium: Arena at Gwinnett Center

Results
- Record: 11–7
- Division place: 2nd AC South
- Playoffs: Won Conference Semifinals (Gladiators) 50–41; Lost Conference championship (Sharks) 55–64

The 2011 Georgia Force season was the eighth season for the franchise in the Arena Football League. The team was coached by Dean Cokinos and played their home games at the Arena at Gwinnett Center. This was the first season for the Force since 2008, after the league went on hiatus in 2009 and the franchise was not active in 2010. In the regular season, the Force went 11–7, qualifying for the playoffs as the 3rd seed in the American Conference. They defeated the Cleveland Gladiators 50–41 in the conference semifinals, but lost 55–64 to the Jacksonville Sharks in the conference championship.

== Standings ==
South Division
Team	W	L	PCT	PF	PA	DIV	CON	Home	Away
z-Jacksonville Sharks	14	4	.778	1158	908	8–0	12–0	8–1	6–3
x-Georgia Force	11	7	.611	1007	931	7–5	5–3	5–4	6–3
x-Orlando Predators	11	7	.611	1001	933	4–4	8–4	6–3	5–4
Tampa Bay Storm	7	11	.389	802	993	2–6	4–8	4–5	3–6
New Orleans VooDoo	3	15	.167	826	1017	1–7	2–10	0–9	3–6

z - Clinched division and conference's best record
x - Clinched playoff berth

== Schedule ==
=== Regular season ===
The Force began the season at home against the Tulsa Talons on March 13. They will finish the regular season on the road against the Iowa Barnstormers on July 23.

Week	Day	Date	Kickoff	Opponent	Results		Location	Report
Week	Day	Date	Kickoff	Opponent	Score	Record	Location	Report
1	Sunday	March 13	4:05 p.m. EDT	Tulsa Talons	W 53–46	1–0	Arena at Gwinnett Center	
2	Friday	March 18	8:00 p.m. EDT	at Jacksonville Sharks	L 57–71	1–1	Jacksonville Veterans Memorial Arena	
3	Bye							
4	Saturday	April 2	8:00 p.m. EDT	at New Orleans VooDoo	W 61–35	2–1	New Orleans Arena	
5	Friday	April 8	8:00 p.m. EDT	Dallas Vigilantes	W 55–48	3–1	Arena at Gwinnett Center	
6	Saturday	April 16	7:30 p.m. EDT	Orlando Predators	L 43–48	3–2	Arena at Gwinnett Center	
7	Saturday	April 23	8:00 p.m. EDT	at Milwaukee Mustangs	W 57–48	4–2	Bradley Center	
8	Saturday	April 30	7:30 p.m. EDT	Pittsburgh Power	W 58–39	5–2	Arena at Gwinnett Center	
9	Friday	May 6	8:05 p.m. EDT	Utah Blaze	L 71–74	5–3	Arena at Gwinnett Center	
10	Friday	May 13	7:05 p.m. EDT	at Philadelphia Soul	L 49–68	5–4	Wells Fargo Center	
11	Saturday	May 21	7:35 p.m. EDT	Jacksonville Sharks	L 55–62	5–5	Arena at Gwinnett Center	
12	Saturday	May 28	10:30 p.m. EDT	at San Jose SaberCats	W 55–49	6–5	HP Pavilion at San Jose	
13	Saturday	June 4	7:35 p.m. EDT	Tampa Bay Storm	W 60–49	7–5	Arena at Gwinnett Center	
14	Saturday	June 11	7:00 p.m. EDT	at Cleveland Gladiators	L 48–62	7–6	Quicken Loans Arena	
15	Friday	June 17	8:05 p.m. EDT	New Orleans VooDoo	W 58–47	8–6	Arena at Gwinnett Center	
16	Saturday	June 25	7:30 p.m. EDT	at Orlando Predators	W 64–34	9–6	Amway Center	
17	Bye							
18	Saturday	July 9	7:35 p.m. EDT	Chicago Rush	L 41–51	9–7	Arena at Gwinnett Center	
19	Saturday	July 16	7:30 p.m. EDT	at Tampa Bay Storm	W 58–40	10–7	St. Pete Times Forum	
20	Saturday	July 23	8:05 p.m. EDT	at Iowa Barnstormers	W 63–59	11–7	Wells Fargo Arena	

=== Playoffs ===
Round	Day	Date	Kickoff	Opponent	Results	Location	Report
AC Semifinals	Sunday	July 31	3:00 p.m. EDT	at Cleveland Gladiators	W 50–41	Quicken Loans Arena	
AC Championship	Monday	August 8	8:00 p.m. EDT	at Jacksonville Sharks	L 55–64	Jacksonville Veterans Memorial Arena	

== Regular season ==
=== Week 1: vs. Tulsa Talons ===
Week 1: Tulsa Talons at Georgia Force – Game summary

Quarter	1	2	3	4	Total
Talons	6	13	7	21	47
Force	14	13	13	13	53

at Arena at Gwinnett Center, Duluth, Georgia

- Date: March 13
- Game time: 4:05 p.m. EDT
- Game attendance: 4,385
- Recap

Game information

1st quarter

- Georgia – (8:55) Benji McDowell 1-yard run (Carlos Martinez kick), Georgia 7–0
- Tulsa – (6:18) Bobby Reid 6-yard run (Juan Bongarra kick failed), Georgia 7–6
- Georgia – (2:20) Michael Johnson 6-yard pass from Brett Elliot (Carlos Martinez kick), Georgia 14–6

2nd quarter

- Georgia – (10:32) Larry Shipp Jr. 22-yard pass from Brett Elliot (Carlos Martinez kick failed), Georgia 20–6
- Tulsa – (8:38) Bobby Reid 39-yard run (Juan Bongarra kick), Georgia 20–13
- Georgia – (7:42) C.J. Johnson 56-yard kickoff return (Carlos Martinez kick), Georgia 27–13
- Tulsa – (3:36) Trent Shelton 14-yard pass from Bobby Reid (Juan Bongarra kick failed), Georgia 27–19

3rd quarter

- Georgia – (9:50) Benji McDowell 1-yard run (Carlos Martinez kick failed), Georgia 33–19
- Tulsa – (5:45) Bobby Reid 1-yard run (Juan Bongarra kick), Georgia 33–26
- Georgia – (2:18) Larry Shipp Jr. 4-yard run (Carlos Martinez kick), Georgia 40–26

4th quarter

- Tulsa – (14:50) Bobby Reid 34-yard run (Juan Bongarra kick), Georgia 40–33
- Georgia – (10:24) Maurice Purify 42-yard pass from Brett Elliot (Carlos Martinez kick), Georgia 47–33
- Georgia – (5:40) Kevin McAlmont 29-yard pass from Michael Johnson (Carlos Martinez kick blocked), Georgia 53–33
- Tulsa – (1:55) Trent Shelton 23-yard pass from Bobby Reid (Juan Bongarra kick), Georgia 53–40
- Tulsa – (0:06) Trent Shelton 31-yard pass from Bobby Reid (Juan Bongarra kick), Georgia 53–47

Passing

- Tulsa – Bobby Reid: 21/32, 218 yards, 3 TD
- Georgia – Brett Elliot: 23/33, 280 yards, 3 TD

Rushing

- Tulsa – Bobby Reid: 6 att, 93 yards, 4 TD
- Georgia – Benji McDowell: 4 att, 2 yards, 2 TD

Receiving

- Tulsa – Trent Shelton: 8 rec, 109 yards, 3 TD
- Georgia – C.J. Johnson: 10 rec, 107 yards

=== Week 2: at Jacksonville Sharks ===
Week 2: Georgia Force at Jacksonville Sharks – Game summary

Quarter	1	2	3	4	Total
Force	7	7	14	29	57
Sharks	3	19	28	21	71

at Jacksonville Veterans Memorial Arena, Jacksonville, Florida

- Date: March 18
- Game time: 8:00 p.m. EDT
- Recap

Game information

1st quarter

- Jacksonville – (9:48) Marco Capozzoli 21-yard field goal, Jacksonville 3–0
- Georgia – (0:46) Larry Shipp Jr. 27-yard pass from Brett Elliot (Carlos Martinez kick), Georgia 7–3

2nd quarter

- Jacksonville – (13:16) Jeron Harvey 8-yard pass from Aaron Garcia (Marco Capozzoli kick blocked), Jacksonville 9–7
- Jacksonville – (10:02) Jomo Wilson 29-yard pass from Aaron Garcia (Marco Capozzoli kick), Jacksonville 16–7
- Georgia – (6:22) Maurice Purify 17-yard pass from Darnell Kennedy (Carlos Martinez kick), Jacksonville 16–14
- Jacksonville – (2:11) Jamarko Simmons 1-yard run (Marco Capozzoli kick failed), Jacksonville 22–14

3rd quarter

- Jacksonville – (12:37) Jeron Harvey 18-yard pass from Aaron Garcia (Jamarko Simmons run), Jacksonville 30–14
- Georgia – (10:12) Larry Shipp Jr. 19-yard pass from Darnell Kennedy (Carlos Martinez kick), Jacksonville 30–21
- Jacksonville – (8:29) Jomo Wilson 3-yard run (Marco Capozzoli kick), Jacksonville 37–21
- Jacksonville – (4:50) Kirby Griffin 4-yard run (Marco Capozzoli kick failed), Jacksonville 43–21
- Jacksonville – (3:16) Terrance Smith 10-yard fumble return (Marco Capozzoli kick), Jacksonville 50–21
- Georgia – (0:07) Brett Elliot 4-yard pass from Brett Elliot (Carlos Martinez kick), Jacksonville 50–28

4th quarter

- Georgia – (11:01) Maurice Purify 16-yard pass from Brett Elliot (Carlos Martinez kick), Jacksonville 50–35
- Jacksonville – (9:13) Jeron Harvey 6-yard pass from Aaron Garcia (LaRoche Jackson run), Jacksonville 58–35
- Georgia – (3:34) Larry Shipp Jr. 5-yard pass from Brett Elliot (Brett Elliot pass), Jacksonville 58–43
- Georgia – (1:45) Maurice Purify 5-yard pass from Brett Elliot (Carlos Martinez kick), Jacksonville 58–50
- Jacksonville – (0:54) Jomo Wilson 8-yard pass from Aaron Garcia (Marco Capozzoli kick), Jacksonville 65–50
- Georgia – (0:49) Maurice Purify 31-yard pass from Brett Elliot (Carlos Martinez kick), Jacksonville 65–57
- Jacksonville – (0:22) Jeron Harvey 4-yard pass from Aaron Garcia (Marco Capozzoli kick failed), Jacksonville 71–57

Passing

- Georgia – Brett Elliott: 19/35, 266 yards, 6 TD, 1 INT
- Jacksonville – Aaron Garcia: 19/25, 177 yards, 6 TD, 1 INT

Rushing

- Georgia – Darnell Kennedy: 2 att, −3 yards
- Jacksonville – Kirby Griffin: 6 att, 10 yards, 1 TD

Receiving

- Georgia – Maurice Purify: 14 rec, 166 yards, 4 TD
- Jacksonville – Jeron Harvey: 7 rec, 70 yards, 4 TD

=== Week 4: at New Orleans VooDoo ===
Week 4: Georgia Force at New Orleans VooDoo – Game summary

Quarter	1	2	3	4	Total
Force	14	28	13	6	61
VooDoo	7	7	13	8	35

at New Orleans Arena, New Orleans, Louisiana

- Date: April 2
- Game time: 8:00 p.m. EDT
- Game attendance: 8,282
- Referee: Chris Sead
- Recap

Game information

1st quarter

- Georgia – (12:51) Maurice Purify 14-yard pass from Brett Elliott (Carlos Martinez kick), Georgia 7–0
- Georgia – (9:52) Ryan Bowers 4-yard run (Carlos Martinez kick), Georgia 14–0
- New Orleans – (5:00) P.J. Berry 6-yard run (Jonathan Ruffin kick), Georgia 14–7

2nd quarter

- Georgia – (14:52) C.J. Johnson 2-yard pass from Brett Elliot (Carlos Martinez kick), Georgia 21–7
- Georgia – (10:29) Maurice Purify 5-yard pass from Brett Elliott (Carlos Martinez kick), Georgia 28–7
- Georgia – (7:55) Mike Johnson 5-yard pass from Brett Elliot (Carlos Martinez kick), Georgia 35–7
- New Orleans – (2:05) Joe Holmes 0-yard fumble recovery (Jonathan Ruffin kick), Georgia 35–14
- Georgia – (0:06) Brett Elliott 1-yard run (Carlos Martinez kick), Georgia 42–14

3rd quarter

- New Orleans – (13:48) Derrick Lewis 12-yard pass from Danny Wimprine (Jonathan Ruffin kick failed), Georgia 42–20
- Georgia – (10:38) Larry Shipp 1-yard run (Carlos Martinez kick failed), Georgia 48–20
- New Orleans – (4:21) Carlese Franklin 6-yard pass from Danny Wimprine (Jonathan Ruffin kick), Georgia 48–27
- Georgia – (3:02) Larry Shipp 19-yard pass from Brett Elliott (Carlos Martinez kick), Georgia 55–27

4th quarter

- Georgia – (11:57) Larry Shipp 22-yard pass from Brett Elliott (Darnell Kennedy rush failed), Georgia 61–27
- New Orleans – (7:28) Eric Scott 17-yard interception return (Derek Cassidy pass), Georgia 61–35

Passing

- Georgia – Brett Elliott: 16/22, 217 yards, 6 TD
- New Orleans – Danny Wimprine: 18/34, 184 yards, 2 TD, 4 INT

Rushing

- Georgia – Ryan Bowers: 2 att, 3 yards, 1 TD
- New Orleans – James Harris: 2 att, 14 yards

Receiving

- Georgia – Maurice Purify: 12 rec, 156 yards, 2 TD
- New Orleans – Carlese Franklin: 7 rec, 89 yards, 1 TD

=== Week 5: vs. Dallas Vigilantes ===
Week 5: Dallas Vigilantes at Georgia Force – Game summary

Quarter	1	2	3	4	Total
Vigilantes	13	21	7	7	48
Force	7	21	13	14	55

at Arena at Gwinnett Center, Duluth, Georgia

- Date: April 8
- Game time: 8:00 p.m. EDT
- Game attendance: 6,335
- Referee: Kevin Stine
- Recap

Game information

1st quarter

- Dallas – (6:40) Derrick Ross 1-yard run (Remy Hamilton kick), Dallas 7–0
- Georgia – (5:05) Larry Shipp 37-yard pass from Brett Elliott (Carlos Martinez kick), Tied 7–7
- Dallas – (1:17) Anthony Jones 29-yard pass from Dan Raudabaugh (Remy Hamilton kick failed), Dallas 13–7

2nd quarter

- Georgia – (13:04) C.J. Johnson 16-yard pass from Brett Elliott (Carlos Martinez kick), Georgia 14–13
- Georgia – (12:14) Ryan Bowers 0-yard fumble recovery (Carlos Martinez kick), Georgia 21–13
- Dallas – (8:08) Derrick Ross 1-yard run (Remy Hamilton kick), Georgia 21–20
- Georgia – (3:45) Maurice Purify 14-yard pass from Brett Elliott (Carlos Martinez kick), Georgia 28–20
- Dallas – (0:45) Derrick Ross 2-yard run (Remy Hamilton kick), Georgia 28–27
- Dallas – (0:25) Justin Warren 34-yard fumble recovery (Remy Hamilton kick), Dallas 34–28

3rd quarter

- Georgia – (10:53) Mike Johnson 3-yard pass from Brett Elliott (Carlos Martinez kick), Georgia 35–34
- Dallas – (1:53) Matt Fields 3-yard run (Remy Hamilton kick), Dallas 41–35
- Georgia – (0:15) Larry Shipp 38-yard pass from Brett Elliott (Carlos Martinez kick failed), Tied 41–41

4th quarter

- Dallas – (13:57) Derrick Ross 20-yard run (Remy Hamilton kick), Dallas 48–41
- Georgia – (12:05) Maurice Purify 8-yard pass from Brett Elliott (Carlos Martinez kick), Tied 48–48
- Georgia – (0:11) Larry Shipp 29-yard pass from Brett Elliott (Carlos Martinez kick), Georgia 55–48

Passing

- Dallas – Dan Raudabaugh: 20/36, 228 yards, 1 TD, 3 INT
- Georgia – Brett Elliot: 23/39, 373 yards, 7 TD, 1 INT

Rushing

- Dallas – Derrick Ross: 13 att, 66 yards, 4 TD
- Georgia – Brett Elliot: 1 att, −2 yards

Receiving

- Dallas – Anthony Jones: 13 rec, 153 yards, 1 TD
- Georgia – Larry Shipp: 9 rec, 213 yards, 3 TD

=== Week 6: vs. Orlando Predators ===
Week 6: Orlando Predators at Georgia Force – Game summary

Quarter	1	2	3	4	Total
Predators	7	7	14	20	48
Force	21	3	13	6	43

at Arena at Gwinnett Center, Duluth, Georgia

- Date: April 16
- Game time: 7:30 p.m. EDT
- Game attendance: 3,797
- Referee: Scott Vaughn
- Recap

Game information

1st quarter

- Georgia – (14:46) C.J. Johnson 57-yard kickoff return (Carlos Martinez kick), Georgia 7–0
- Georgia – (6:40) C.J. Johnson 1-yard pass from Larry Shipp (Carlos Martinez kick), Georgia 14–0
- Orlando – (4:30) Robert Quiroga 14-yard pass from Nick Hill (Mark Lewis kick), Georgia 14–7
- Georgia – (1:40) Maurice Purify 8-yard pass from Brett Elliott (Carlos Martinez kick), Georgia 21–7

2nd quarter

- Orlando – (14:16) T.T. Toliver 28-yard pass from Nick Hill (Mark Lewis kick), Georgia 21–14
- Georgia – (0:04) Carlos Martinez 17-yard field goal, Georgia 24–14

3rd quarter

- Orlando – (12:36) Bobby Sippio 10-yard pass from Nick Hill (Mark Lewis kick), Georgia 24–21
- Georgia – (9:15) Mike Johnson 6-yard pass from Brett Elliott (Carlos Martinez kick), Georgia 31–21
- Orlando – (2:17) T.T. Toliver 6-yard pass from Nick Hill (Mark Lewis kick), Georgia 31–28
- Georgia – (0:46) Maurice Purify 29-yard pass from Brett Elliott (Carlos Martinez kick failed), Georgia 37–28

4th quarter

- Orlando – (12:32) Robert Quiroga 3-yard pass from Nick Hill (Mark Lewis kick), Georgia 37–35
- Orlando – (4:59) Marlon Moye-Moore 1-yard run (Mark Lewis kick), Orlando 42–37
- Georgia – (1:11) Darnell Kennedy 7-yard run (Darnell Kennedy pass failed), Georgia 43–42
- Orlando – (0:38) Nick Hill 23-yard run (Nick Hill pass failed), Orlando 48–43

Passing

- Orlando – Nick Hill: 25/40, 328 yards, 5 TD
- Georgia – Brett Elliott: 20/27, 215 yards, 3 TD, 2 INT

Rushing

- Orlando – Nick Hill: 3 att, 29 yards, 1 TD
- Georgia – Darnell Kennedy: 3 att, 12 yards, 1 TD

Receiving

- Orlando – T.T. Toliver: 7 rec, 111 yards, 2 TD
- Georgia – Murice Purify: 7 rec, 95 yards, 2 TD

=== Week 7: at Milwaukee Mustangs ===
Week 7: Georgia Force at Milwaukee Mustangs – Game summary

Quarter	1	2	3	4	Total
Force	16	13	14	14	57
Mustangs	0	6	14	28	48

at Bradley Center, Milwaukee, Wisconsin

- Date: April 23
- Game time: 8:00 p.m. EDT
- Game attendance: 3,712
- Referee: Alex Kemp
- Recap

Game information

1st quarter

- Georgia – (9:45) Maurice Purify 28-yard pass from Brett Elliott (Carlos Martinez kick), Georgia 7–0
- Georgia – (6:10) Team safety, Georgia 9–0
- Georgia – (3:02) Maurice Purify 14-yard pass from Brett Elliott (Carlos Martinez kick), Georgia 16–0

2nd quarter

- Milwaukee – (10:23) Mike Aguayo 1-yard pass from R.J. Archer (Garrett Lindholm kick failed), Georgia 16–6
- Georgia – (6:23) Ben McDowell 1-yard run (Carlos Martinez kick), Georgia 23–6
- Georgia – (0:21) Maurice Purify 31-yard pass from Brett Elliott (Carlos Martinez kick failed), Georgia 29–6

3rd quarter

- Georgia – (12:20) Larry Shipp 5-yard pass from Brett Elliott (Carlos Martinez kick), Georgia 36–6
- Milwaukee – (7:39) Damian Harrell 14-yard pass from R.J. Archer (R.J. Archer pass), Georgia 36–14
- Milwaukee – (4:21) Brent Holmes 1-yard run (R.J. Archer pass failed), Georgia 36–20
- Georgia – (1:12) C.J. Johnson 9-yard pass from Brett Elliott (Carlos Martinez kick), Georgia 43–20

4th quarter

- Milwaukee – (13:39) Mykel Benson 22-yard pass from R.J. Archer (Mykel Benson rush failed), Georgia 43–26
- Milwaukee – (12:15) Andre Jones 47-yard interception return (R.J. Archer. pass failed), Georgia 43–32
- Georgia – (9:04) Mike Johnson 8-yard pass from Brett Elliott (Carlos Martinez kick), Georgia 50–32
- Milwaukee – (3:23) Damian Harrell 9-yard pass from R.J. Archer (Mykel Benson rush), Georgia 50–40
- Georgia – (0:56) Larry Shipp 7-yard pass from Brett Elliott (Carlos Martinez kick), Georgia 57–40
- Milwaukee – (0:06) Mykel Benson 8-yard pass from R.J. Archer (R.J. Archer pass), Georgia 57–48

Passing

- Georgia – Brett Elliott: 20/31, 246 yards, 7 TD, 1 INT
- Milwaukee – R.J. Archer: 26/45, 281 yards, 5 TD, 3 INT

Rushing

- Georgia – Ben McDowell: 1 att, 1 yard, 1 TD
- Milwaukee – Mykel Benson: 6 att, 20 yards

Receiving

- Georgia – Maurice Purify: 6 rec, 105 yards, 3 TD
- Milwaukee – Ernest Smith: 10 rec, 139 yards

=== Week 8: vs. Pittsburgh Power ===
Week 8: Pittsburgh Power at Georgia Force – Game summary

Quarter	1	2	3	4	Total
Power	13	6	0	20	39
Force	13	7	21	17	58

at Arena at Gwinnett Center, Duluth, Georgia

- Date: April 30
- Game time: 7:30 p.m. EDT
- Game attendance: 2,093
- Referee: Joe Pester
- Recap

Game information

1st quarter

- Pittsburgh – (11:32) Xavier Lee 6-yard pass from Anthony Morelli (Paul Edinger kick), Pittsburgh 7–0
- Georgia – (10:31) C.J. Johnson 45-yard pass from Brett Elliot (Carlos Martinez kick), Tied 7–7
- Pittsburgh – (7:09) Jason Willis 4-yard pass from Anthony Morelli (Paul Edinger kick failed), Pittsburgh 13–7
- Georgia – (0:44) Maurice Purify 4-yard pass from Brett Elliot (Carlos Martinez kick failed), Tied 13–13

2nd quarter

- Georgia – (11:40) C.J. Johnson 13-yard pass from Brett Elliot (Carlos Martinez kick), Georgia 20–13
- Pittsburgh – (0:55) Joshua Rue 6-yard run (Paul Edinger kick failed), Georgia 20–19

3rd quarter

- Georgia – (13:14) Larry Shipp 15-yard pass from Brett Elliot (Carlos Martinez kick), Georgia 27–19
- Georgia – (6:09) Maurice Purify 4-yard pass from Brett Elliot (Carlos Martinez kick), Georgia 34–19
- Georgia – (0:25) Maurice Purify 6-yard pass from Brett Elliot (Carlos Martinez kick), Georgia 41–19

4th quarter

- Pittsburgh – (12:20) Xavier Lee 1-yard run (Paul Edinger kick), Georgia 41–26
- Georgia – (11:17) Maurice Purify 17-yard pass from Brett Elliot (Carlos Martinez kick), Georgia 48–26
- Pittsburgh – (7:40) Xavier Lee 2-yard run (Paul Edinger kick), Georgia 48–33
- Georgia – (4:19) Carlos Martinez 33-yard field goal, Georgia 51–33
- Georgia – (0:34) C.J. Johnson 44-yard pass from Brett Elliot (Carlos Martinez kick), Georgia 58–33
- Pittsburgh – (0:15) Craig Fulton 6-yard pass from Xavier Lee (Xavier Lee pass failed), Georgia 58–39

Passing

- Pittsburgh – Anthony Morelli: 22/41, 188 yards, 2 TD, 3 INT
- Georgia – Brett Elliott: 20/34, 261 yards, 8 TD, 1 INT

Rushing

- Pittsburgh – Joshua Rue: 9 att, 34 yards, 1 TD
- Georgia – Ben McDowell: 2 att, 2 yards

Receiving

- Pittsburgh – Jason Willis: 8 rec, 79 yards, 1 TD
- Georgia – C.J. Johnson: 8 rec, 140 yards, 3 TD

=== Week 9: vs. Utah Blaze ===
Week 9: Utah Blaze at Georgia Force – Game summary

Quarter	1	2	3	4	Total
Blaze	12	28	14	20	74
Force	13	21	14	23	71

at Arena at Gwinnett Center, Duluth, Georgia

- Date: May 6
- Game time: 8:05 p.m. EDT
- Game attendance: 3,259
- Referee: Kevin Stine
- Recap

Game information

1st quarter

- Georgia – (11:03) Maurice Purify 7-yard pass from Brett Elliott (Brian Jackson kick), Georgia 7–0
- Utah – (6:55) Alvance Robinson 5-yard pass from Tommy Grady (Greg Gunderson kick failed), Georgia 7–6
- Utah – (4:11) Aaron Boone 16-yard pass from Tommy Grady (Greg Gunderson kick failed), Utah 12–7
- Georgia – (0:32) Maurice Purify 23-yard pass from Brett Elliott (Brian Jackson kick failed), Georgia 13–12

2nd quarter

- Utah – (12:59) Aaron Boone 20-yard pass from Tommy Grady (Greg Gunderson kick), Utah 19–13
- Georgia – (12:11) C.J. Johnson 56-yard kickoff return (Brian Jackson kick), Georgia 20–19
- Utah – (11:13) Ernest Pierce 10-yard kickoff return (Greg Gunderson kick), Utah 26–20
- Georgia – (7:10) C.J. Johnson 3-yard pass from Brett Elliott (Brian Jackson kick), Georgia 27–26
- Utah – (2:42) Jason Boone 4-yard pass from Tommy Grady (Greg Gunderson kick), Utah 33–27
- Georgia – (0:54) C.J. Johnson 27-yard pass from Brett Elliott (Brian Jackson kick), Georgia 34–33
- Utah – (0:00) Aaron Lesue 2-yard pass from Tommy Grady (Greg Gunderson kick), Utah 40–34

3rd quarter

- Utah – (8:58) Alvance Robinson 15-yard pass from Tommy Grady (Greg Gunderson kick), Utah 47–34
- Utah – (7:20) Alvance Robinson 3-yard pass from Tommy Grady (Greg Gunderson kick), Utah 54–34
- Georgia – (5:55) C.J. Johnson 30-yard pass from Brett Elliott (Brian Jackson kick), Utah 54–41
- Georgia – (3:15) Larry Shipp 7-yard pass from Brett Elliott (Brian Jackson kick), Utah 54–48

4th quarter

- Utah – (14:56) Aaron Lesue 14-yard pass from Tommy Grady (Greg Gunderson kick), Utah 61–48
- Georgia – (11:58) Maurice Purify 2-yard pass from Brett Elliott (Brian Jackson kick), Utah 61–55
- Georgia – (10:42) Team safety, Utah 61–57
- Georgia – (8:31) Larry Shipp 13-yard pass from Brett Elliott (Brian Jackson kick), Georgia 64–61
- Utah – (5:17) Aaron Lesue 15-yard pass from Tommy Grady (Greg Gunderson kick blocked), Utah 67–64
- Georgia – (3:33) Maurice Purify 39-yard pass from Brett Elliott (Brian Jackson kick), Georgia 71–67
- Utah – (0:04) Aaron Boone 2-yard pass from Tommy Grady (Greg Gunderson kick), Utah 74–71

Passing

- Utah – Tommy Grady: 33/45, 344 yards, 10 TD
- Georgia – Brett Elliott: 27/38, 374 yards, 9 TD

Rushing

- Utah – Tommy Grady: 3 att, 11 yards
- Georgia – Brett Elliott: 2 att, 5 yards

Receiving

- Utah – Aaron Boone: 18 rec, 196 yards, 3 TD
- Georgia – Maurice Purify: 9 rec, 141 yards, 1 TD

=== Week 10: at Philadelphia Soul ===
Week 10: Georgia Force at Philadelphia Soul – Game summary

Quarter	1	2	3	4	Total
Force	14	14	14	7	49
Soul	20	27	7	14	68

at Wells Fargo Center, Philadelphia

- Date: May 13
- Game time: 7:05 p.m. EDT
- Game attendance: 7,551
- Referee: Joe Pester
- Recap

Game information

1st quarter

- Philadelphia – (12:23) Syvelle Newton 38-yard pass from Ryan Vena (Robbie Smith kick blocked), Philadelphia 6–0
- Georgia – (9:53) Maurice Purify 1-yard pass from Brett Elliott (Carlos Martinez kick), Georgia 7–6
- Philadelphia – (6:52) Darnell Whitley 15-yard pass from Ryan Vena (Robbie Smith kick), Philadelphia 13–7
- Georgia – (3:02) Maurice Purify 12-yard pass from Brett Elliott (Carlos Martinez kick), Georgia 14–13
- Philadelphia – (1:02) Keith Stokes 11-yard pass from Ryan Vena (Robbie Smith kick), Philadelphia 20–14

2nd quarter

- Georgia – (8:31) Maurice Purify 9-yard pass from Brett Elliott (Carlos Martinez kick), Georgia 21–20
- Philadelphia – (6:04) Donovan Morgan 45-yard pass from Ryan Vena (Robbie Smith kick), Philadelphia 27–21
- Georgia – (3:59) Maurice Purify 2-yard pass from Larry Shipp (Carlos Martinez kick), Georgia 28–27
- Philadelphia – (2:17) Donovan Morgan 45-yard pass from Ryan Vena (Robbie Smith kick), Philadelphia 34–28
- Philadelphia – (0:56) Ryan Vena 1-yard run (Robbie Smith kick failed), Philadelphia 40–28
- Philadelphia – (0:40) Donovan Morgan 3-yard pass from Ryan Vena (Robbie Smith kick), Philadelphia 47–28

3rd quarter

- Georgia – (14:44) C.J. Johnson 56-yard kickoff return (Carlos Martinez kick), Philadelphia 47–35
- Philadelphia – (8:46) Damian Walker 5-yard run (Robbie Smith kick), Philadelphia 54–35
- Georgia – (3:05) Maurice Purify 9-yard pass from Brett Elliott (Carlos Martinez kick), Philadelphia 54–42

4th quarter

- Philadelphia – (11:53) Ryan Vena 1-yard run (Robbie Smith kick), Philadelphia 61–42
- Philadelphia – (5:13) Donovan Morgan 35-yard pass from Ryan Vena (Robbie Smith kick), Philadelphia 68–42
- Georgia – (1:16) C.J. Johnson 44-yard pass from Brett Elliott (Carlos Martinez kick), Philadelphia 68–49

Passing

- Georgia – Brett Elliott: 21/44, 301 yards, 5 TD, 3 INT
- Philadelphia – Ryan Vena: 20/28, 320 yards, 7 TD, 3 INT

Rushing

- Georgia – Brett Elliott: 2 att, 2 yards
- Philadelphia – Damian Walker: 1 att, 5 yards, 1 TD

Receiving

- Georgia – Maurice Purify: 10 rec, 92 yards, 5 TD
- Philadelphia – Donovan Morgan: 5 rec, 135 yards, 4 TD

=== Week 11: vs. Jacksonville Sharks ===
Week 11: Jacksonville Sharks at Georgia Force – Game summary

Quarter	1	2	3	4	Total
Sharks	14	21	6	21	62
Force	7	24	7	17	55

at Arena at Gwinnett Center, Duluth, Georgia

- Date: May 21
- Game time: 7:35 p.m. EDT
- Game attendance: 4,301
- Referee: Chris Snead
- Recap

Game information

1st quarter

- Georgia – (13:23) Maurice Purify 41-yard pass from Brett Elliott (Carlos Martinez kick), Georgia 7–0
- Jacksonville – (8:07) Jomo Wilson 3-yard pass from Aaron Garcia (Marco Capozzoli kick), Tied 7–7
- Jacksonville – (2:54) Jomo Wilson 21-yard pass from Aaron Garcia (Marco Capozzoli kick), Jacksonville 14–7

2nd quarter

- Jacksonville – (14:57) Jomo Wilson 5-yard pass from Aaron Garcia (Marco Capozzoli kick), Jacksonville 21–7
- Georgia – (10:43) Maurice Purify 7-yard pass from Brett Elliott (Carlos Martinez kick), Jacksonville 21–14
- Jacksonville – (8:04) Jeron Harvey 26-yard pass from Aaron Garcia (Marco Capozzoli kick), Jacksonville 28–14
- Georgia – (4:53) Larry Shipp 31-yard pass from Brett Elliott (Carlos Martinez kick), Jacksonville 28–21
- Jacksonville – (3:45) Kirby Griffin 1-yard run (Marco Capozzoli kick), Jacksonville 35–21
- Georgia – (0:13) Carlos Martinez 33-yard field goal, Jacksonville 35–24
- Georgia – (0:09) Maurice Purify 4-yard pass from Brett Elliott (Carlos Martinez kick), Jacksonville 35–31

3rd quarter

- Georgia – (4:30) C.J. Johnson 7-yard pass from Brett Elliott (Carlos Martinez kick), Georgia 38–35
- Jacksonville – (1:42) Sale' Key 28-yard pass from Aaron Garcia (Marco Capozzoli kick failed), Jacksonville 41–38

4th quarter

- Georgia – (12:08) Maurice Purify 5-yard pass from Brett Elliott (Carlos Martinez kick), Georgia 45–41
- Jacksonville – (10:23) Jeron Harvey 37-yard pass from Aaron Garcia (Marco Capozzoli kick), Jacksonville 48–45
- Georgia – (6:05) Carlos Martinez 40-yard field goal, Tied 48–48
- Jacksonville – (4:26) Jeron Harvey 25-yard pass from Aaron Garcia (Marco Capozzoli kick failed), Jacksonville 54–48
- Georgia – (2:00) Larry Shipp 5-yard pass from Brett Elliott (Carlos Martinez kick), Georgia 55–54
- Jacksonville – (1:29) Jeron Harvey 11-yard pass from Aaron Garcia (Aaron Garcia pass), Jacksonville 62–55

Passing

- Jacksonville – Aaron Garcia: 22/29, 279 yards, 8 TD, 1 INT
- Georgia – Brett Elliott: 30/47, 283 yards, 7 TD, 1 INT

Rushing

- Jacksonville – Kirby Griffin: 9 att, 15 yards, 1 TD
- Georgia – Brett Elliott: 5 att, 18 yards

Receiving

- Jacksonville – Jeron Harvey: 5 rec, 97 yards, 4 TD
- Georgia – Larry Shipp: 11 rec, 126 yards, 2 TD

=== Week 12: at San Jose SaberCats ===
Week 12: Georgia Force at San Jose SaberCats – Game summary

Quarter	1	2	3	4	Total
Force	10	21	10	14	55
SaberCats	7	21	15	6	49

at HP Pavilion at San Jose, San Jose, California

- Date: May 28
- Game time: 10:30 p.m. EDT
- Game attendance: 10,231
- Referee: Shawn Hochuli
- Recap

Game information

1st quarter

- Georgia – (10:03) C.J. Johnson 47-yard pass from Brett Elliott (Carlos Martinez kick), Georgia 7–0
- San Jose – (7:15) Ben Nelson 8-yard pass from Mark Grieb (Juan Gamboa kick), Tied 7–7
- Georgia – (2:21) Carlos Martinez 25-yard field goal, Georgia 10–7

2nd quarter

- San Jose – (13:28) Chad Cook 1-yard run (Juan Gamboa kick), San Jose 14–10
- Georgia – (9:16) Larry Shipp 10-yard pass from Brett Elliott (Carlos Martinez kick), Georgia 17–14
- San Jose – (8:08) Mervin Brookins 42-yard pass from Mark Grieb (Juan Gamboa kick), San Jose 21–17
- Georgia – (3:03) Ben McDowell 1-yard run (Carlos Martinez kick), Georgia 24–21
- Georgia – (0:03) Brett Elliott 4-yard run (Carlos Martinez kick), Georgia 31–21
- San Jose – (0:00) Mervin Brookins 24-yard pass from Mark Grieb (Juan Gamboa kick), Georgia 31–28

3rd quarter

- Georgia – (11:09) Mike Johnson 8-yard pass from Brett Elliott (Carlos Martinez kick), Georgia 38–28
- San Jose – (9:35) Mervin Brookins 14-yard pass from Mark Grieb (Juan Gamboa kick), Georgia 38–35
- Georgia – (4:28) Carlos Martinez 47-yard field goal, Georgia 41–35
- San Jose – (1:40) Chad Cook 1-yard run (Juan Gamboa rush), San Jose 43–41

4th quarter

- Georgia – (14:17) Larry Shipp 13-yard pass from Brett Elliott (Carlos Martinez kick failed), Georgia 47–43
- San Jose – (10:30) Ben Nelson 12-yard pass from Mark Grieb (Juan Gamboa kick failed), San Jose 49–47
- Georgia – (0:29) Larry Shipp 16-yard pass from Brett Elliott (Brett Elliott pass), Georgia 55–49

Passing

- Georgia – Brett Elliott: 31/46, 368 yards, 5 TD
- San Jose – Mark Grieb: 24/34, 358 yards, 5 TD, 1 INT

Rushing

- Georgia – Brett Elliott: 1 att, 4 yards, 1 TD
- San Jose – Chad Cook: 8 att, 14 yards, 2 TD

Receiving

- Georgia – C.J. Johnson: 13 rec, 159 yards, 1 TD
- San Jose – Mervin Brookins: 9 rec, 136 yards, 3 TD

=== Week 13: vs. Tampa Bay Storm ===
Week 13: Tampa Bay Storm at Georgia Force – Game summary

Quarter	1	2	3	4	Total
Storm	3	7	19	20	49
Force	7	18	14	21	60

at Arena at Gwinnett Center, Duluth, Georgia

- Date: June 4
- Game time: 7:35 p.m. EDT
- Game attendance: 4,023
- Referee: Scott Vaughn
- Recap

Game information

1st quarter

- Georgia – (7:26) Larry Shipp 30-yard pass from Brett Elliott (Carlos Martinez kick), Georgia 7–0
- Tampa Bay – (0:30) Kyle Chilton 43-yard field goal, Georgia 7–3

2nd quarter

- Georgia – (9:27) Maurice Purify 9-yard pass from Brett Elliott, Georgia 13–3
- Tampa Bay – (5:04) Amarri Jackson 7-yard pass from Brian Zbydniewski (Kyle Chilton kick), Georgia 13–10
- Georgia – (0:56) Mike Johnson 2-yard pass from Brett Elliott (Carlos Martinez kick), Georgia 20–10
- Georgia – (0:54) Team safety, Georgia 22–10
- Georgia – (0:00) Carlos Martinez 26-yard field goal, Georgia 25–10

3rd quarter

- Tampa Bay – (9:38) Huey Whittaker 3-yard pass from Brian Zbydniewski (Kyle Chilton kick), Georgia 25–17
- Georgia – (7:40) Maurice Purify 35-yard pass from Brett Elliott (Carlos Martinez kick), Georgia 32–17
- Tampa Bay – (6:18) Hank Edwards 47-yard pass from Brian Zbydniewski (Kyle Chilton rush fumbled), Georgia 32–23
- Georgia – (4:18) Maurice Purify 13-yard pass from Brett Elliott (Carlos Martinez kick), Georgia 39–23
- Tampa Bay – (2:25) Huey Whittaker 6-yard pass from Brian Zbydniewski (Kyle Chilton kick failed), Georgia 39–29

4th quarter

- Georgia – (14:57) Maurice Purify 14-yard pass from Brett Elliott (Carlos Martinez kick), Georgia 46–29
- Tampa Bay – (10:30) Michael Hawthorne 21-yard interception return (Kyle Chilton kick), Georgia 46–36
- Georgia – (8:35) Maurice Purify 6-yard pass from Brett Elliott (Carlos Martinez kick), Georgia 53–36
- Tampa Bay – (5:21) Hank Edwards 19-yard pass from Brian Zbydniewski (Kyle Chilton kick), Georgia 53–43
- Georgia – (2:47) Ben McDowell 1-yard run (Carlos Martinez kick), Georgia 60–43
- Tampa Bay – (0:14) Michael Lindsey 15-yard pass from Brian Zbydniewski, Georgia 60–49

Passing

- Tampa Bay – Brian Zbydniewski: 22/41, 314 yards, 6 TD
- Georgia – Brett Elliott: 22/32, 248 yards, 7 TD, 1 INT

Rushing

- Tampa Bay – Terrence Royal: 1 att, 3 yards
- Georgia – Brett Elliott: 1 att, 15 yards

Receiving

- Tampa Bay – Hank Edwards: 6 rec, 142 yards, 2 TD
- Georgia – Maurice Purify: 8 rec, 120 yards, 5 TD

=== Week 14: at Cleveland Gladiators ===
Week 14: Georgia Force at Cleveland Gladiators – Game summary

Quarter	1	2	3	4	Total
Force	7	21	7	13	48
Gladiators	21	14	7	20	62

at Quicken Loans Arena, Cleveland, Ohio

- Date: June 11
- Game time: 7:00 p.m. EDT
- Game attendance: 5,029
- Referee: Tony Cannella
- Recap

Game information

1st quarter

- Cleveland – (10:53) Russell Monk 3-yard run (Matt Denny kick), Cleveland 7–0
- Georgia – (8:34) Ben McDowell 1-yard run (Carlos Martinez kick), Tied 7–7
- Cleveland – (4:56) Thyron Lewis 5-yard pass from Kurt Rocco (Matt Denny kick), Cleveland 14–7
- Cleveland – (3:04) Joe Phinisee 27-yard interception return (Matt Denny kick), Cleveland 21–7

2nd quarter

- Georgia – (12:22) Ben McDowell 1-yard run (Carlos Martinez kick), Cleveland 21–14
- Cleveland – (11:33) Quorey Payne 56-yard kickoff return (Matt Denny kick blocked), Cleveland 27–14
- Georgia – (8:19) Ben McDowell 1-yard run (Carlos Martinez kick), Cleveland 27–21
- Georgia – (5:10) Brett Elliott 4-yard run (Carlos Martinez kick), Georgia 28–27
- Cleveland – (1:02) Calvin Wilson 4-yard pass from Kurt Rocco (Kurt Rocco pass), Cleveland 35–28

3rd quarter

- Georgia – (10:46) Larry Shipp 3-yard pass from Brett Elliott (Carlos Martinez kick), Tied 35–35
- Cleveland – (7:24) Robert Redd 6-yard pass from Kurt Rocco (Matt Denny kick), Cleveland 42–35

4th quarter

- Cleveland – (14:11) Dominick Goodman 11-yard pass from Kurt Rocco (Matt Denny kick), Cleveland 49–35
- Georgia – (10:11) Mike Johnson 4-yard pass from Brett Elliott (Carlos Martinez kick blocked), Cleveland 49–41
- Cleveland – (7:52) Thyron Lewis 9-yard pass from Kurt Rocco (Matt Denny kick), Cleveland 56–41
- Georgia – (5:17) Larry Shipp 3-yard pass from Brett Elliott (Carlos Martinez kick), Cleveland 56–48
- Cleveland – (2:16) Quorey Payne 11-yard pass from Kurt Rocco (Matt Denny kick failed), Cleveland 62–48

Passing

- Georgia – Brett Elliott: 31/42, 318 yards, 3 TD, 3 INT
- Cleveland – Kurt Rocco: 23/29, 212 yards, 6 TD

Rushing

- Georgia – Ben McDowell: 6 att, 4 yards, 3 TD
- Cleveland – Russell Monk: 2 att, 3 yards, 1 TD

Receiving

- Georgia – Larry Shipp: 13 rec, 138 yards, 2 TD
- Cleveland – Dominick Goodman: 10 rec, 122 yards, 1 TD

=== Week 15: vs. New Orleans VooDoo ===
Week 15: New Orleans VooDoo at Georgia Force – Game summary

Quarter	1	2	3	4	Total
VooDoo	7	13	7	20	47
Force	7	17	21	13	58

at Arena at Gwinnett Center, Duluth, Georgia

- Date: June 17
- Game time: 8:05 p.m. EDT
- Game attendance: 4,009
- Referee: Joe Pester
- Recap

Game information

1st quarter

- New Orleans – (6:17) Tom Taggert 15-yard run (Jonathan Ruffin kick), New Orleans 7–0
- Georgia – (2:37) Maurice Purify 19-yard pass from Brett Elliott (Carlos Martinez kick), Tied 7–7

2nd quarter

- Georgia – (14:18) Carlos Martinez 29-yard field goal, Georgia 10–7
- New Orleans – (9:43) Lucas Taylor 11-yard pass from D. Bryant (Jonathan Ruffin kick), New Orleans 14–10
- Georgia – (8:50) C.J. Johnson 56-yard kickoff return (Carlos Martinez kick), Georgia 17–14
- New Orleans – (0:49) P.J. Berry 2-yard run (Jonathan Ruffin kick failed), New Orleans 20–17
- Georgia – (0:14) Maurice Purify 15-yard pass from Brett Elliott (Carlos Martinez kick), Georgia 24–20

3rd quarter

- Georgia – (14:24) Ahmad Hawkins 4-yard interception return (Carlos Martinez kick), Georgia 31–20
- New Orleans – (12:17) Skyler Green 5-yard pass from Danny Wimprine (Jonathan Ruffin kick), Georgia 31–27
- Georgia – (10:12) Mike Johnson 4-yard pass from Brett Elliott (Carlos Martinez kick), Georgia 38–27
- Georgia – (4:40) Maurice Purify 16-yard pass from Brett Elliott (Carlos Martinez kick), Georgia 45–27

4th quarter

- New Orleans – (9:09) Skyler Green 2-yard pass from D. Bryant (Jonathan Ruffin kick), Georgia 45–34
- New Orleans – (7:55) Tom Taggert 2-yard run (Jonathan Ruffin kick blocked), Georgia 45–40
- Georgia – (4:09) Maurice Purify 10-yard pass from Brett Elliott (Carlos Martinez kick), Georgia 52–40
- New Orleans – (1:36) D. Bryant 2-yard run (Jonathan Ruffin kick), Georgia 52–47
- Georgia – (0:48) Mike Johnson 7-yard pass from Brett Elliott, Georgia 58–47

Passing

- New Orleans – D. Bryant: 21/34, 239 yards, 2 TD, 1 INT
- Georgia – Brett Elliott: 19/33, 179 yards, 6 TD, 1 INT

Rushing

- New Orleans – Tom Taggert: 7 att, 38 yards, 2 TD
- Georgia – None

Receiving

- New Orleans – Skyler Green: 11 rec, 150 yards, 2 TD
- Georgia – Maurice Purify: 11 rec, 106 yards, 4 TD

=== Week 16: at Orlando Predators ===
Week 16: Georgia Force at Orlando Predators – Game summary

Quarter	1	2	3	4	Total
Force	3	23	10	28	64
Predators	7	7	6	14	34

at Amway Center, Orlando, Florida

- Date: June 25
- Game time: 7:30 p.m. EDT
- Game attendance: 11,364
- Referee: Kevin Stein
- Recap

Game information

1st quarter

- Orlando – (13:26) Bobby Sippio 3-yard pass from Nick Hill (Mark Lewis kick), Orlando 7–0
- Georgia – (7:07) Carlos Martinez 36-yard field goal, Orlando 7–3

2nd quarter

- Georgia – (14:09) Maurice Purify 1-yard pass from Brett Elliott (Carlos Martinez kick), Georgia 10–7
- Orlando – (13:09) T.T. Toliver 18-yard pass from Nick Hill (Mark Lewis kick), Orlando 14–10
- Georgia – (0:32) Lance Ancar 1-yard run (Carlos Martinez kick), Georgia 17–14
- Georgia – (0:23) Team safety, Georgia 19–14
- Georgia – (0:11) Maurice Purify 41-yard pass from Brett Elliott (Carlos Martinez kick), Georgia 26–14

3rd quarter

- Georgia – (12:24) Maurice Purify 15-yard pass from Brett Elliott (Carlos Martinez kick), Georgia 33–14
- Orlando – (10:40) Robert Quiroga 8-yard pass from Nick Hill (Mark Lewis kick blocked), Georgia 33–20
- Georgia – (3:08) Carlos Martinez 30-yard field goal, Georgia 36–20

4th quarter

- Georgia – (13:17) Larry Shipp 13-yard pass from Brett Elliott (Carlos Martinez kick), Georgia 43–20
- Orlando – (9:57) T.T. Toliver 7-yard run (Mark Lewis kick), Georgia 43–27
- Georgia – (9:45) Caleb Bostic 9-yard kickoff return (Carlos Martinez kick), Georgia 50–27
- Georgia – (5:13) Larry Shipp 48-yard pass from Brett Elliott (Carlos Martinez kick), Georgia 57–27
- Georgia – (2:25) Robert Durham 46-yard interception return (Carlos Martinez kick), Georgia 64–27
- Orlando – (0:50) Josh Bush 11-yard pass from Collin Drafts (Mark Lewis kick), Georgia 64–34

Passing

- Georgia – Brett Elliott: 18/29, 320 yards, 5 TD
- Orlando – Nick Hill: 21/33, 244 yards, 3 TD, 1 INT

Rushing

- Georgia – Brett Elliott: 1 att, 8 yards
- Orlando – T.T. Toliver: 2 att, 9 yards, 1 TD

Receiving

- Georgia – Larry Shipp: 6 rec, 152 yards, 2 TD
- Orlando – T.T. Toliver: 8 rec, 99 yards, 1 TD

=== Week 18: vs. Chicago Rush ===
Week 18: Chicago Rush at Georgia Force – Game summary

Quarter	1	2	3	4	Total
Rush	28	10	6	7	51
Force	14	0	7	20	41

at Arena at Gwinnett Center, Duluth, Georgia

- Date: July 9
- Game time: 7:35 p.m. EDT
- Game attendance: 9,723
- Referee: Chris Snead
- Recap

Game information

1st quarter

- Chicago – (13:05) Charles Dillon 13-yard pass from J.J. Raterink (Rob Forstrom kick), Chicago 7–0
- Chicago – (11:40) Kelvin Morris 12-yard fumble recovery (Rob Forstrom kick), Chicago 14–0
- Georgia – (10:17) Alonzo Nix 30-yard pass from Brett Elliott (Carlos Martinez kick), Chicago 14–7
- Chicago – (4:09) J.J. Raterink 1-yard run (Rob Forstrom kick), Chicago 21–7
- Georgia – (2:25) Larry Shipp 22-yard pass from Brett Elliott (Carlos Martinez kick), Chicago 21–14
- Chicago – (0:27) Derek Lee 21-yard pass from J.J. Raterink (Rob Forstrom kick), Chicago 28–14

2nd quarter

- Chicago – (12:12) Rob Forstrom 20-yard field goal, Chicago 31–14
- Chicago – (8:45) Kelvin Morris 37-yard interception return (Rob Forstrom kick), Chicago 38–14

3rd quarter

- Georgia – (13:05) Eric Crosby 12-yard interception return (Carlos Martinez kick), Chicago 38–21
- Chicago – (7:10) Reggie Gray 7-yard pass from J.J. Raterink (Rob Forstrom kick failed), Chicago 44–21

4th quarter

- Chicago – (14:25) Reggie Gray 24-yard pass from J.J. Raterink (Rob Forstrom kick), Chicago 51–21
- Georgia – (8:49) C.J. Johnson 5-yard pass from Darnell Kennedy (Carlos Martinez kick), Chicago 51–28
- Georgia – (4:50) Mike Johnson 3-yard pass from Darnell Kennedy (Carlos Martinez kick), Chicago 51–35
- Georgia – (0:20) Alonzo Nix 3-yard pass from Darnell Kennedy, Chicago 51–41

Passing

- Chicago – J.J. Raterink: 20/30, 223 yards, 4 TD, 1 INT
- Georgia – Darnell Kennedy: 15/25, 161 yards, 3 TD, 1 INT

Rushing

- Chicago – Marcus Waugh: 3 att, 14 yards
- Georgia – Larry Shipp: 1 att, 5 yards

Receiving

- Chicago – Reggie Gray: 11 rec, 113 yards, 2 TD
- Georgia – C.J. Johnson: 10 rec, 111 yards, 1 TD

=== Week 19: at Tampa Bay Storm ===
Week 19: Georgia Force at Tampa Bay Storm – Game summary

Quarter	1	2	3	4	Total
Force	3	28	14	13	58
Storm	0	7	20	13	40

at St. Pete Times Forum, Tampa, Florida

- Date: July 16
- Game time: 7:30 p.m. EDT
- Game attendance: 9,700
- Referee: Tom McCabe
- Recap

Game information

1st quarter

- Georgia – (9:49) Carlos Martinez 19-yard field goal, Georgia 3–0

2nd quarter

- Georgia – (9:44) Lance Ancar 1-yard run (Carlos Martinez kick), Georgia 10–0
- Georgia – (3:21) Larry Shipp 30-yard pass from Darnell Kennedy (Carlos Martinez kick), Georgia 17–0
- Tampa Bay – (1:53) Hank Edwards 18-yard pass from Danny Southwick (Greg Gunderson kick), Georgia 17–7
- Georgia – (0:13) C.J. Johnson 4-yard pass from Darnell Kennedy (Carlos Martinez kick), Georgia 24–7
- Georgia – (0:09) Eric Scott 2-yard fumble recovery (Carlos Martinez kick), Georgia 31–7

3rd quarter

- Tampa Bay – (11:48) Michael Lindsey 40-yard pass from Matt Grothe (Greg Gunderson kick), Georgia 31–14
- Tampa Bay – (11:31) Tom Kaleita 5-yard pass from Matt Grothe (Greg Gunderson kick failed), Georgia 31–20
- Georgia – (10:02) Mike Johnson 6-yard pass from Darnell Kennedy (Carlos Martinez kick), Georgia 38–20
- Tampa Bay – (6:29) Amarri Jackson 29-yard pass from Matt Grothe (Greg Gunderson kick), Georgia 38–27
- Georgia – (4:16) C.J. Johnson 18-yard pass from Darnell Kennedy (Carlos Martinez kick), Georgia 45–27

4th quarter

- Tampa Bay – (14:54) Amarri Jackson 12-yard pass from Matt Grothe (Greg Gunderson kick), Georgia 45–34
- Georgia – (4:54) Mike Johnson 29-yard pass from Darnell Kennedy (Carlos Martinez kick), Georgia 52–34
- Georgia – (3:18) Tracy Belton 30-yard interception return (Carlos Martinez kick failed), Georgia 58–34
- Tampa Bay – (0:43) Amarri Jackson 17-yard pass from Matt Grothe (Greg Gunderson kick failed), Georgia 58–40

Passing

- Georgia – Darnell Kennedy: 12/20, 130 yards, 5 TD, 1 INT
- Tampa Bay – Matt Grothe: 12/24, 161 yards, 5 TD, 1 INT

Rushing

- Georgia – Lance Ancar: 3 att, 8 yards, 1 TD
- Tampa Bay – Danny Southwick: 1 att, 9 yards

Receiving

- Georgia – Mike Johnson: 7 rec, 61 yards, 2 TD
- Tampa Bay – Amarri Jackson: 8 rec, 112 yards, 3 TD

=== Week 20: at Iowa Barnstormers ===
Week 20: Georgia Force at Iowa Barnstormers – Game summary

Quarter	1	2	3	4	Total
Force	21	14	7	21	63
Barnstormers	13	23	13	10	59

at Wells Fargo Arena, Des Moines, Iowa

- Date: July 23
- Game time: 8:05 p.m. EDT
- Game attendance: 10,871
- Referee: Joe Pester
- Recap

Game information

1st quarter

- Georgia – (12:48) C.J. Johnson 28-yard pass from Darnell Kennedy (Carlos Martinez kick), Georgia 7–0
- Iowa – (10:02) Bryan Lee-Laudusky 1-yard run (Nick Pertuit kick), Tied 7–7
- Georgia – (8:10) Darnell Kennedy 9-yard run (Carlos Martinez kick), Georgia 14–7
- Georgia – (2:25) Larry Shipp 6-yard pass from Darnell Kennedy (Carlos Martinez kick), Georgia 21–7
- Iowa – (0:21) Jesse Schmidt 17-yard pass from Bryan Lee-Laudusky (Nick Pertuit kick failed), Georgia 21–13

2nd quarter

- Georgia – (13:43) Maurice Purify 33-yard pass from Darnell Kennedy (Carlos Martinez kick), Georgia 28–13
- Iowa – (9:28) Marquis Hamilton 14-yard pass from Bryan Lee-Laudusky (Nick Pertuit kick), Georgia 28–20
- Iowa – (4:36) Jesse Schmidt 32-yard pass from Bryan Lee-Laudusky (Nick Pertuit kick failed), Georgia 28–26
- Iowa – (3:35) Travon Johnson 0-yard net recovery (Nick Pertuit kick), Iowa 33–28
- Georgia – (2:18) Larry Shipp 44-yard pass from Darnell Kennedy (Carlos Martinez kick), Georgia 35–33
- Iowa – (0:00) Nick Pertuit 18-yard field goal, Iowa 36–35

3rd quarter

- Iowa – (8:39) Jesse Schmidt 5-yard pass from Brian Villanueva (Team rush failed), Iowa 42–35
- Georgia – (4:53) Larry Shipp 14-yard pass from Darnell Kennedy (Carlos Martinez kick), Tied 42–42
- Iowa – (1:46) Jesse Schmidt 4-yard pass from Brian Villanueva (Nick Pertuit kick), Iowa 49–42

4th quarter

- Georgia – (14:21) Maurice Purify 40-yard pass from Darnell Kennedy (Carlos Martinez kick), Tied 49–49
- Iowa – (9:08) Nick Pertuit 37-yard field goal, Iowa 52–49
- Georgia – (5:44) Maurice Purify 9-yard pass from Darnell Kennedy (Carlos Martinez kick), Georgia 56–52
- Iowa – (2:40) Jesse Schmidt 30-yard pass from Brian Villanueva (Nick Pertuit kick), Iowa 59–56
- Georgia – (0:25) Benji McDowell 1-yard run (Carlos Martinez kick), Georgia 63–59

Passing

- Georgia – Darnell Kennedy: 21/32, 373 yards, 7 TD, 1 INT
- Iowa – Bryan Lee-Laudusky: 14/18, 206 yards, 3 TD, 1 INT

Rushing

- Georgia – Darnell Kennedy: 1 att, 9 yards, 1 TD
- Iowa – Bryan Lee-Laudusky: 3 att, 6 yards, 1 TD

Receiving

- Georgia – Larry Shipp: 8 rec, 152 yards, 3 TD
- Iowa – Jesse Schmidt: 12 rec, 170 yards, 5 TD

== Playoffs ==
=== American Conference Semifinals: at (2) Cleveland Gladiators ===
American Conference Semifinals: Georgia Force at Cleveland Gladiators – Game summary

Quarter	1	2	3	4	Total
(3) Force	7	13	14	16	50
(2) Gladiators	14	7	0	20	41

at Quicken Loans Arena, Cleveland, Ohio

- Date: July 31
- Game time: 3:00 p.m. EDT
- Game attendance: 4,948
- Referee: Tony Cannella
- Recap

Game information

1st quarter

- Georgia – (11:40) Larry Shipp 9-yard pass from Darnell Kennedy (Carlos Martinez kick), Georgia 7–0
- Cleveland – (9:22) Robert Redd 30-yard pass from Kurt Rocco (Matt Denny kick), Tied 7–7
- Cleveland – (5:27) Troy Bergeron 12-yard pass from Kurt Rocco (Matt Denny kick), Cleveland 14–7

2nd quarter

- Georgia – (12:20) Benji McDowell 1-yard run (Carlos Martinez kick), Tied 14–14
- Cleveland – (10:25) Robert Redd 9-yard pass from Kurt Rocco (Matt Denny kick), Cleveland 21–14
- Georgia – (0:00) Mike Johnson 2-yard fumble recovery (Carlos Martinez kick failed), Cleveland 21–20

3rd quarter

- Georgia – (10:26) Maurice Purify 16-yard pass from Darnell Kennedy (Carlos Martinez kick), Georgia 27–21
- Georgia – (5:45) Ahmad Hawkins 40-yard fumble recovery (Carlos Martinez kick), Georgia 34–21

4th quarter

- Georgia – (14:55) Maurice Purify 7-yard pass from Darnell Kennedy (Carlos Martinez kick blocked), Georgia 40–21
- Cleveland – (11:03) Troy Bergeron 13-yard pass from John Dutton (Matt Denny kick blocked), Georgia 40–27
- Georgia – (3:54) Carlos Martinez 21-yard field goal, Georgia 43–27
- Cleveland – (1:04) Robert Redd 3-yard pass from John Dutton (Russell Monk rush), Georgia 43–35
- Georgia – (0:36) Darnell Kennedy 15-yard run (Carlos Martinez kick), Georgia 50–35
- Cleveland – (0:25) Troy Bergeron 7-yard pass from John Dutton (Matt Denny kick blocked), 50–41

Passing

- Georgia – Darnell Kennedy: 18/35, 202 yards, 3 TD
- Cleveland – Kurt Rocco: 15/20, 164 yards, 3 TD, 1 INT

Rushing

- Georgia – Darnell Kennedy: 4 att, 19 yards, 1 TD
- Cleveland – Carlos Downey: 1 att, 7 yards

Receiving

- Georgia – Maurice Purify: 7 rec, 91 yards, 2 TD
- Cleveland – Troy Bergeron: 10 rec, 119 yards, 3 TD

=== American Conference Championship: at (1) Jacksonville Sharks ===
American Conference Championship: Georgia Force at Jacksonville Sharks – Game summary

Quarter	1	2	3	4	Total
(3) Force	14	20	7	14	55
(1) Sharks	13	27	14	10	64

at Jacksonville Veterans Memorial Arena, Jacksonville, Florida

- Date: July 23
- Game time: 8:05 p.m. EDT
- Game attendance: 10,891
- Referee: David Cutaia
- Recap

Game information

1st quarter

- Jacksonville – (13:10) Jeron Harvey 10-yard pass from Aaron Garcia (Aaron Garcia pass failed), Jacksonville 6–0
- Georgia – (7:48) Mike Johnson 4-yard pass from Darnell Kennedy (Carlos Martinez kick), Georgia 7–6
- Jacksonville – (4:08) Jamarko Simmons 2-yard run (Marco Capozzoli kick), Jacksonville 13–7
- Georgia – (0:21) Maurice Purify 5-yard pass from Darnell Kennedy (Carlos Martinez kick), Georgia 14–13

2nd quarter

- Jacksonville – (13:23) Jeff Hughley 35-yard pass from Aaron Garcia (Marco Capozzoli kick), Jacksonville 20–14
- Georgia – (10:41) Maurice Purify 25-yard pass from Darnell Kennedy (Carlos Martinez kick), Georgia 21–20
- Jacksonville – (7:37) Jamarko Simmons 5-yard pass from Aaron Garcia (Marco Capozzoli kick), Jacksonville 27–21
- Georgia – (5:18) C.J. Johnson 31-yard pass from Darnell Kennedy (Carlos Martinez kick), Georgia 28–27
- Jacksonville – (2:57) Jeff Hughley 35-yard pass from Aaron Garcia (Marco Capozzoli kick failed), Jacksonville 33–28
- Georgia – (0:38) Mike Johnson 4-yard pass from Darnell Kennedy (Carlos Martinez kick failed), Georgia 34–33
- Jacksonville – (0:09) Jomo Wilson 19-yard pass from Aaron Garcia (Marco Capozzoli kick), Jacksonville 40–34

3rd quarter

- Jacksonville – (11:19) Jeron Harvey 17-yard pass from Aaron Garcia (Marco Capozzoli kick), Jacksonville 47–34
- Georgia – (5:07) C.J. Johnson 5-yard pass from Darnell Kennedy (Carlos Martinez kick), Jacksonville 47–41
- Jacksonville – (2:13) Jamarko Simmons 9-yard pass from Aaron Garcia (Marco Capozzoli kick), Jacksonville 54–41

4th quarter

- Georgia – (12:38) Mike Johnson 4-yard pass from Darnell Kennedy (Carlos Martinez kick), Jacksonville 54–48
- Jacksonville – (11:19) Jeff Hughley 39-yard pass from Aaron Garcia (Marco Capozzoli kick), Jacksonville 61–48
- Georgia – (5:13) Maurice Purify 11-yard pass from Darnell Kennedy (Carlos Martinez kick), Jacksonville 61–55
- Jacksonville – (0:59) Marco Capozzoli 36-yard field goal, Jacksonville 64–55

Passing

- Georgia – Darnell Kennedy: 29/48, 313 yards, 8 TD, 1 INT
- Jacksonville – Aaron Garcia: 22/28, 313 yards, 8 TD

Rushing

- Georgia – Darnell Kennedy: 2 att, 6 yards
- Jacksonville – Jamarko Simmons: 1 att, 5 yards, 1 TD

Receiving

- Georgia – Maurice Purify: 13 rec, 153 yards, 3 TD
- Jacksonville – Jeff Hughley: 7 rec, 168 yards, 3 TD
