= 2011 Jacksonville Sharks season =

Arena Football League team season

- Head coach: Les Moss
- Home stadium: Jacksonville Veterans Memorial Arena

Results
- Record: 14–4
- Division place: 1st AC South
- Playoffs: Won Conference Semifinals (Predators) 63–48; Won Conference Championship (Force) 64–55; Won ArenaBowl XXIV (Rattlers) 73–70
- Team OPY: Aaron Garcia

The 2011 Jacksonville Sharks season was the second season for the franchise in the Arena Football League. The team was coached by Les Moss and played their home games at Jacksonville Veterans Memorial Arena. In the regular season, the Sharks went 14–4, qualifying for the playoffs as the top seed in the American Conference. After defeating the Orlando Predators in the conference semifinals, they beat the Georgia Force in the American Conference championship. Advancing to ArenaBowl XXIV, the Sharks triumphed over the Arizona Rattlers on a last-second game-winning touchdown pass to win their first ArenaBowl championship.

== Standings ==
South Division
Team	W	L	PCT	PF	PA	DIV	CON	Home	Away
z-Jacksonville Sharks	14	4	.778	1158	908	8–0	12–0	8–1	6–3
x-Georgia Force	11	7	.611	1007	931	7–5	5–3	5–4	6–3
x-Orlando Predators	11	7	.611	1001	933	4–4	8–4	6–3	5–4
Tampa Bay Storm	7	11	.389	802	993	2–6	4–8	4–5	3–6
New Orleans VooDoo	3	15	.167	826	1017	1–7	2–10	0–9	3–6

z - Clinched division and conference's best record
x - Clinched playoff berth

== Season schedule ==
=== Preseason ===
Day	Date	Kickoff	Opponent	Score	Location	Report
Monday	February 28	7:00 p.m. EST	Tampa Bay Storm	W 56–19	Jacksonville Veterans Memorial Arena	

=== Regular season ===
The Sharks will begin the season on the road against the Arizona Rattlers on March 12. Their home opener will be on March 18 against the Georgia Force. They hosted the Spokane Shock in their final regular season game on July 22.

Week	Day	Date	Kickoff	Opponent	Results		Location	Report
Week	Day	Date	Kickoff	Opponent	Score	Record	Location	Report
1	Saturday	March 12	9:00 p.m. EST	at Arizona Rattlers	L 52–55	0–1	US Airways Center	
2	Friday	March 18	8:00 p.m. EDT	Georgia Force	W 71–57	1–1	Jacksonville Veterans Memorial Arena	
3	Saturday	March 26	7:00 p.m. EDT	New Orleans VooDoo	W 64–33	2–1	Jacksonville Veterans Memorial Arena	
4	Friday	April 1	8:00 p.m. EDT	at Tampa Bay Storm	W 54–30	3–1	St. Pete Times Forum	
5	Bye							
6	Saturday	April 16	7:00 p.m. EDT	at Pittsburgh Power	W 65–40	4–1	Consol Energy Center	
7	Saturday	April 23	7:00 p.m. EDT	Cleveland Gladiators	W 56–42	5–1	Jacksonville Veterans Memorial Arena	
8	Saturday	April 30	8:00 p.m. EDT	Orlando Predators	W 76–55	6–1	Jacksonville Veterans Memorial Arena	
9	Friday	May 6	7:00 p.m. EDT	at Philadelphia Soul	W 58–42	7–1	Wells Fargo Center	
10	Friday	May 13	8:00 p.m. EDT	Iowa Barnstormers	W 79–27	8–1	Jacksonville Veterans Memorial Arena	
11	Saturday	May 21	7:35 p.m. EDT	at Georgia Force	W 62–55	9–1	Arena at Gwinnett Center	
12	Bye							
13	Friday	June 3	8:00 p.m. EDT	at New Orleans VooDoo	W 62–55	10–1	New Orleans Arena	
14	Saturday	June 11	7:30 p.m. EDT	at Orlando Predators	W 68–67	11–1	Amway Center	
15	Saturday	June 18	7:00 p.m. EDT	Milwaukee Mustangs	W 62–47	12–1	Jacksonville Veterans Memorial Arena	
16	Saturday	June 25	7:00 p.m. EDT	Tampa Bay Storm	W 66–41	13–1	Jacksonville Veterans Memorial Arena	
17	Saturday	July 2	10:30 p.m. EDT	at San Jose SaberCats	L 70–83	13–2	HP Pavilion at San Jose	
18	Saturday	July 9	7:00 p.m. EDT	Dallas Vigilantes	L 70–75	13–3	Jacksonville Veterans Memorial Arena	
19	Friday	July 15	8:30 p.m. EDT	at Kansas City Command	L 48–49 (OT)	13–4	Sprint Center	
20	Friday	July 22	8:00 p.m. EDT	Spokane Shock	W 75–56	14–4	Jacksonville Veterans Memorial Arena	

=== Playoffs ===
Round	Day	Date	Kickoff	Opponent	Results	Location	Report
AC Semifinals	Friday	July 29	8:00 p.m. EDT	Orlando Predators	W 63–48	Jacksonville Veterans Memorial Arena	
AC Championship	Monday	August 8	8:00 p.m. EDT	Georgia Force	W 64–55	Jacksonville Veterans Memorial Arena	
ArenaBowl XXIV	Friday	August 12	8:30 p.m. EDT	Arizona Rattlers	W 73–70	US Airways Center	

== Regular season ==
=== Week 1: at Arizona Rattlers ===
Week 1: Jacksonville Sharks at Arizona Rattlers – Game summary

Quarter	1	2	3	4	Total
Sharks	16	14	7	15	52
Rattlers	6	19	8	22	55

at US Airways Center, Phoenix, Arizona

- Date: March 12
- Game time: 9:00 p.m. EST
- Game attendance: 8,428
- Recap

Game information

1st quarter

- Jacksonville – (11:11) Marco Capozzoli 28-yard field goal, Jacksonville 3–0
- Jacksonville – (6:45) Omar Jacobs 1-yard run (Marco Capozzoli kick failed), Jacksonville 9–0
- Arizona – (4:35) Trandon Harvey 30-yard pass from Nick Davilla, (Joe Schroeder kick failed), Jacksonville 9–6
- Jacksonville – (2:14) Jeron Harvey 43-yard pass from Aaron Garcia (Marco Capozzoli kick), Jacksonville 16–6

2nd quarter

- Arizona – (12:01) Trandon Harvey 9-yard pass from Nick Davilla (Joe Schroeder kick), Jacksonville 16–13
- Jacksonville – (8:50) Jeron Harvey 9-yard pass from Aaron Garcia (Marco Capozzoli kick), Jacksonville 23–13
- Arizona – (5:01) Nick Davila 6-yard run (Joe Schroeder kick failed), Jacksonville 23–19
- Jacksonville – (2:20) Jomo Wilson 12-yard pass from Aaron Garcia (Marco Capozzoli kick), Jacksonville 30–19
- Arizona – (0:00) Nate Forse 16-yard pass from Nick Davila (Joe Schroeder kick failed), Jacksonville 30–25

3rd quarter

- Jacksonville – (7:00) Jomo Wilson 2-yard run (Marco Capozzoli kick), Jacksonville 37–25
- Arizona – (2:40) Trandon Harvey 9-yard pass from Nick Davila (Odie Armstrong run), Jacksonville 37–33

4th quarter

- Jacksonville – (14:16) Marco Capozzoli 27-yard field goal, Jacksonville 40–33
- Arizona – (10:06) Trandon Harvey 15-yard pass from Nick Davila (Joe Schroeder kick), Tied 40–40
- Jacksonville – (6:14) Sale' Key 7-yard pass from Aaron Garcia (Marco Capozzoli kick failed), Jacksonville 46–40
- Arizona – (5:17) Virgil Gray 57-yard kickoff return (Joe Schroeder kick), Arizona 47–46
- Jacksonville – (1:20) Jomo Wilson 34-yard pass from Aaron Garcia (Aaron Garcia pass failed), Jacksonville 52–47
- Arizona – (0:31) Jason Geathers 9-yard pass from Nick Davila (Trandon Harvey run), Arizona 55–52

Passing

- Jacksonville – Aaron Garcia: 24/39, 259 yards, 5 TD, 2 INT
- Arizona – Nick Davila: 27/46, 284 yards, 6 TD

Rushing

- Jacksonville – Kirby Griffin: 6 att, 26 yards
- Arizona – Nick Davila: 2 att, 3 yards, 1 TD

Receiving

- Jacksonville – Jeron Harvey: 9 rec, 110 yards, 2 TD
- Arizona – Trandon Harvey: 12 rec, 130 yards, 4 TD

=== Week 2: vs. Georgia Force ===
Week 2: Georgia Force at Jacksonville Sharks – Game summary

Quarter	1	2	3	4	Total
Force	7	7	14	29	57
Sharks	3	19	28	21	71

at Jacksonville Veterans Memorial Arena, Jacksonville, Florida

- Date: March 18
- Game time: 8:00 p.m. EDT
- Recap

Game information

1st quarter

- Jacksonville – (9:48) Marco Capozzoli 21-yard field goal, Jacksonville 3–0
- Georgia – (0:46) Larry Shipp Jr. 27-yard pass from Brett Elliot (Carlos Martinez kick), Georgia 7–3

2nd quarter

- Jacksonville – (13:16) Jeron Harvey 8-yard pass from Aaron Garcia (Marco Capozzoli kick blocked), Jacksonville 9–7
- Jacksonville – (10:02) Jomo Wilson 29-yard pass from Aaron Garcia (Marco Capozzoli kick), Jacksonville 16–7
- Georgia – (6:22) Maurice Purify 17-yard pass from Darnell Kennedy (Carlos Martinez kick), Jacksonville 16–14
- Jacksonville – (2:11) Jamarko Simmons 1-yard run (Marco Capozzoli kick failed), Jacksonville 22–14

3rd quarter

- Jacksonville – (12:37) Jeron Harvey 18-yard pass from Aaron Garcia (Jamarko Simmons run), Jacksonville 30–14
- Georgia – (10:12) Larry Shipp Jr. 19-yard pass from Darnell Kennedy (Carlos Martinez kick), Jacksonville 30–21
- Jacksonville – (8:29) Jomo Wilson 3-yard run (Marco Capozzoli kick), Jacksonville 37–21
- Jacksonville – (4:50) Kirby Griffin 4-yard run (Marco Capozzoli kick failed), Jacksonville 43–21
- Jacksonville – (3:16) Terrance Smith 10-yard fumble return (Marco Capozzoli kick), Jacksonville 50–21
- Georgia – (0:07) Brett Elliot 4-yard pass from Brett Elliot (Carlos Martinez kick), Jacksonville 50–28

4th quarter

- Georgia – (11:01) Maurice Purify 16-yard pass from Brett Elliot (Carlos Martinez kick), Jacksonville 50–35
- Jacksonville – (9:13) Jeron Harvey 6-yard pass from Aaron Garcia (LaRoche Jackson run), Jacksonville 58–35
- Georgia – (3:34) Larry Shipp Jr. 5-yard pass from Brett Elliot (Brett Elliot pass), Jacksonville 58–43
- Georgia – (1:45) Maurice Purify 5-yard pass from Brett Elliot (Carlos Martinez kick), Jacksonville 58–50
- Jacksonville – (0:54) Jomo Wilson 8-yard pass from Aaron Garcia (Marco Capozzoli kick), Jacksonville 65–50
- Georgia – (0:49) Maurice Purify 31-yard pass from Brett Elliot (Carlos Martinez kick), Jacksonville 65–57
- Jacksonville – (0:22) Jeron Harvey 4-yard pass from Aaron Garcia (Marco Capozzoli kick failed), Jacksonville 71–57

Passing

- Georgia – Brett Elliott: 19/35, 266 yards, 6 TD, 1 INT
- Jacksonville – Aaron Garcia: 19/25, 177 yards, 6 TD, 1 INT

Rushing

- Georgia – Darnell Kennedy: 2 att, −3 yards
- Jacksonville – Kirby Griffin: 6 rec, 10 yards, 1 TD

Receiving

- Georgia – Maurice Purify: 14 rec, 166 yards, 4 TD
- Jacksonville – Jeron Harvey: 7 rec, 70 yards, 4 TD

=== Week 3: vs. New Orleans VooDoo ===
Week 3: New Orleans VooDoo at Jacksonville Sharks – Game summary

Quarter	1	2	3	4	Total
VooDoo	6	13	7	7	33
Sharks	13	19	13	19	64

at Jacksonville Veterans Memorial Arena, Jacksonville, Florida

- Date: March 26
- Game time: 7:00 p.m. EDT
- Recap

Game information

1st quarter

- New Orleans – (13:48) Carlese Franklin 30 yd pass from Danny Wimprine (Jonathan Ruffin kick failed), New Orleans 6–0
- Jacksonville – (13:03) Jomo Wilson 45 yd pass from Aaron Garcia (Marco Capozzoli kick failed), Tied 6–6
- Jacksonville – (4:02) Jeron Harvey 14 yd pass from Aaron Garcia (Marco Capozzoli kick), Jacksonville 13–6

2nd quarter

- Jacksonville – (13:12) Jomo Wilson 22 yd pass from Aaron Garcia (Marco Capozzoli kick failed), Jacksonville 19–6
- New Orleans – (9:58) Carlese Franklin 29 yd pass from Danny Wimprine (Jonathan Ruffin kick failed), Jacksonville 19–12
- Jacksonville – (6:53) Sale' Key 19 yd pass from Aaron Garcia (Marco Capozzoli kick), Jacksonville 26–12
- New Orleans – (2:42) Moqut Ruffins 24 yd pass from Danny Wimprine (Jonathan Ruffin kick), Jacksonville 26–19
- Jacksonville – (1:29) Jeron Harvey 20 yd pass from Aaron Garcia (Marco Capozzoli kick failed), Jacksonville 32–19

3rd quarter

- Jacksonville – (12:26) Jeron Harvey 36 yd pass from Aaron Garcia (Marco Capozzoli kick), Jacksonville 39–19
- New Orleans – (6:14) P.J. Berry 26 yd pass from Danny Wimprine (Jonathan Ruffin kick), Jacksonville 39–26
- Jacksonville – (4:48) Jomo Wilson 48 yd pass from Aaron Garcia (Marco Capozzoli kick failed), Jacksonville 45–26

4th quarter

- Jacksonville – (14:25) Sale' Key 15 yd pass from Aaron Garcia (Marco Capozzoli kick failed), Jacksonville 51–26
- New Orleans – (11:46) Carlese Franklin 30 yd pass from Derek Cassidy (Jonathan Ruffin kick), Jacksonville 51–33
- Jacksonville – (10:59) Sale' Key 12 yd kickoff return (Kirby Griffin rush failed), Jacksonville 57–33
- Jacksonville – (0:11) Jeron Harvey 34 yd pass from Omar Jacobs (Marco Capozzoli kick), Jacksonville 64–33

Passing

- New Orleans – Danny Wimprine: 13/29, 180 yards, 4 TD, 1 INT
- Jacksonville – Aaron Garcia: 17/19, 308 yards, 8 TD

Rushing

- New Orleans – Jason Schule: 6 att, 15 yards
- Jacksonville – Jeron Harvey: 1 rec, 5 yards

Receiving

- New Orleans – Carlese Franklin: 5 rec, 104 yards, 3 TD
- Jacksonville – Jomo Wilson: 4 rec, 120 yards, 3 TD

=== Week 4: at Tampa Bay Storm ===
Week 4: Jacksonville Sharks at Tampa Bay Storm – Game summary

Quarter	1	2	3	4	Total
Sharks	6	20	21	7	54
Storm	14	10	6	0	30

at St. Pete Times Forum, Tampa, Florida

- Date: April 1
- Game time: 8:00 p.m. EDT
- Game attendance: 10,304
- Referee: Perry Havener
- Recap

Game information

1st quarter

- Tampa Bay – (11:28) Huey Whittaker 4-yard pass from Grant Gregory (Kyle Chilton kick), Tampa Bay 7–0
- Tampa Bay – (6:17) Amari Jackson 9-yard pass from Grant Gregory (Kyle Chilton kick), Tampa Bay 14–0
- Jacksonville – (4:19) Sale' Key 5-yard pass from Aaron Garcia (Marco Capozzoli kick failed), Tampa Bay 14–6

2nd quarter

- Tampa Bay – (14:56) Huey Whittaker 7-yard pass from Grant Gregory (Kyle Chilton kick), Tampa Bay 21–6
- Jacksonville – (12:34) Kirby Griffin 4-yard run (Marco Capozzoli kick), Tampa Bay 21–13
- Tampa Bay – (8:38) Kyle Chilton 49-yard field goal, Tampa Bay 24–13
- Jacksonville – (5:44) Jeff Hughley 9-yard pass from Aaron Garcia (Marco Capozzoli kick), Tampa Bay 24–20
- Jacksonville – (0:11) Jomo Wilson 12-yard pass from Aaron Garcia (Marco Capozzoli kick failed), Jacksonville 26–24

3rd quarter

- Jacksonville – (9:08) Jeff Hughley 4-yard pass from Aaron Garcia (Marco Capozzoli kick), Jacksonville 33–24
- Tampa Bay – (5:31) Hank Edwards 20-yard pass from Grant Gregory (Kyle Chilton kick failed), Jacksonville 33–30
- Jacksonville – (2:48) Sale' Key 7-yard pass from Aaron Garcia (Marco Capozzoli kick), Jacksonville 40–30
- Jacksonville – (0:08) Kirby Griffin 8-yard run (Marco Capozzoli kick), Jacksonville 47–30

4th quarter

- Jacksonville – (8:57) Jomo Wilson 25-yard pass from Aaron Garcia (Marco Capozzoli kick), Jacksonville 54–30

Passing

- Jacksonville – Aaron Garcia: 21/27, 238 yards, 6 TD, 1 INT
- Tampa Bay – Grant Gregory: 27/42, 285 yards, 4 TD

Rushing

- Jacksonville – Kirby Griffin: 4 att, 33 yards, 2 TD
- Tampa Bay – Grant Gregory: 4 att, 12 yards

Receiving

- Jacksonville – Jomo Wilson: 7 rec, 111 yards, 2 TD
- Tampa Bay – Huey Whittaker: 8 rec, 85 yards, 2 TD

=== Week 6: at Pittsburgh Power ===
Week 6: Jacksonville Sharks at Pittsburgh Power – Game summary

Quarter	1	2	3	4	Total
Sharks	14	24	13	14	65
Power	14	7	13	6	40

at Consol Energy Center, Pittsburgh, Pennsylvania

- Date: April 16
- Game time: 7:00 p.m. EDT
- Game attendance: 9,773
- Referee: Tony Cannella
- Recap

Game information

1st quarter

- Jacksonville – (8:54) Kirby Griffin 4-yard run (Marco Capozzoli kick), Jacksonville 7–0
- Pittsburgh – (5:31) Xavier Lee 8-yard pass from Anthony Morelli (Paul Edinger kick), Tied 7–7
- Jacksonville – (1:10) Sale' Key 9-yard pass from Aaron Garcia (Marco Capozzoli kick), Jacksonville 14–7
- Pittsburgh – (0:04) Lonnell Dewalt 45-yard pass from Anthony Morelli (Paul Edinger kick), Tied 14–14

2nd quarter

- Jacksonville – (12:34) Jamarko Simmons 2-yard run (Marco Capozzoli kick), Jacksonville 21–14
- Pittsburgh – (9:36) Joshua Rue 1-yard run (Paul Edinger kick), Tied 21–21
- Jacksonville – (6:12) Isaac Morales 9-yard pass from Aaron Garcia (Marco Capozzoli kick), Jacksonville 28–21
- Jacksonville – (1:14) Jamarko Simmons 1-yard run (Marco Capozzoli kick), Jacksonville 35–21
- Jacksonville – (0:00) Marco Capozzoli 24-yard field goal, Jacksonville 38–21

3rd quarter

- Pittsburgh – (13:14) Jason Willis 42-yard pass from Anthony Morelli (Paul Edinger kick), Jacksonville 38–28
- Jacksonville – (10:44) Jomo Wilson 7-yard pass from Aaron Garcia (Marco Capozzoli kick), Jacksonville 45–28
- Pittsburgh – (8:54) Michael Washington 23-yard pass from Anthony Morelli (Paul Edinger kick failed), Jacksonville 45–34
- Jacksonville – (2:04) Jomo Wilson 12-yard pass from Aaron Garcia (Marco Capozzoli kick failed), Jacksonville 51–34

4th quarter

- Jacksonville – (10:58) Kirby Griffin 6-yard run (Marco Capozzoli kick), Jacksonville 58–34
- Pittsburgh – (5:51) Lonnell Dewalt 18-yard pass from Anthony Morelli (Paul Edinger kick failed), Jacksonville 58–40
- Jacksonville – (3:47) Jeron Harvey 6-yard pass from Aaron Garcia (Marco Capozzoli kick), Jacksonville 65–40

Passing

- Jacksonville – Aaron Garcia: 31/44, 297 yards, 5 TD
- Pittsburgh – Anthony Morelli: 20/36, 290 yards, 5 TD

Rushing

- Jacksonville – Kirby Griffin: 6 att, 26 yards, 2 TD
- Pittsburgh – Anthony Morelli: 1 att, 28 yards

Receiving

- Jacksonville – Sale' Key: 11 rec, 116 yards, 1 TD
- Pittsburgh – Jason Willis: 8 rec, 100 yards, 1 TD

=== Week 7: vs. Cleveland Gladiators ===
Week 7: Cleveland Gladiators at Jacksonville Sharks – Game summary

Quarter	1	2	3	4	Total
Gladiators	7	22	13	0	42
Sharks	7	14	15	20	56

at Jacksonville Veterans Memorial Arena, Jacksonville, Florida

- Date: April 23
- Game time: 7:00 p.m. EDT
- Recap

Game information

1st quarter

- Cleveland – (9:12) Kurt Rocco 1-yard run (Matt Denny kick), Cleveland 7–0
- Jacksonville – (4:42) Kirby Griffin 2-yard run (Marco Capozzoli kick), Tied 7–7

2nd quarter

- Cleveland – (14:34) Kurt Rocco 1-yard run (Matt Denny kick), Cleveland 14–7
- Jacksonville – (10:20) Jeron Harvey 10-yard pass from Aaron Garcia (Marco Capozzoli kick), Tied 14–14
- Cleveland – (6:30) Robert Redd 49-yard pass from Kurt Rocco (Matt Denny kick), Cleveland 21–14
- Jacksonville – (3:41) Kirby Griffin 0-yard fumble recovery (Marco Capozzoli kick), Tied 21–21
- Cleveland – (0:19) Kurt Rocco 2-yard run (Matt Denny kick failed), Cleveland 27–21
- Cleveland – (0:16) Team safety, Cleveland 29–21

3rd quarter

- Jacksonville – (12:02) Jomo Wilson 28-yard pass from Aaron Garcia (Jeff Hughley rush), Tied 29–29
- Cleveland – (6:44) Robert Redd 14-yard pass from Kurt Rocco (Matt Denny kick), Cleveland 36–29
- Jacksonville – (2:56) Jeron Harvey 3-yard pass from Aaron Garcia (Marco Capozzoli kick), Tied 36–36
- Cleveland – (0:22) Troy Bergeron 28-yard pass from Kurt Rocco (Matt Denny kick failed), Cleveland 42–36

4th quarter

- Jacksonville – (11:37) Jeron Harvey 7-yard pass from Aaron Garcia (Marco Capozzoli kick failed), Tied 42–42
- Jacksonville – (3:35) Aaron Garcia 5-yard run (Marco Capozzoli kick), Jacksonville 49–42
- Jacksonville – (0:38) Jomo Wilson 22-yard pass from Aaron Garcia (Marco Capozzoli kick), Jacksonville 56–42

Passing

- Cleveland – Kurt Rocco: 25/37, 180 yards, 4 TD, 2 INT
- Jacksonville – Aaron Garcia: 24/33, 277 yards, 5 TD

Rushing

- Cleveland – Russell Monk: 2 att, 7 yards
- Jacksonville – Kirby Griffin: 5 rec, 18 yards, 1 TD

Receiving

- Cleveland – Dominick Goodman: 10 rec, 131 yards, 2 TD
- Jacksonville – Jomo Wilson: 8 rec, 108 yards, 2 TD

=== Week 8: vs. Orlando Predators ===
Week 8: Orlando Predators at Jacksonville Sharks – Game summary

Quarter	1	2	3	4	Total
Predators	14	21	7	13	55
Sharks	7	33	14	22	76

at Jacksonville Veterans Memorial Arena, Jacksonville, Florida

- Date: April 30
- Game time: 8:00 p.m. EDT
- Game attendance: 10,150
- Referee: Chris Snead
- Recap

Game information

1st quarter

- Jacksonville – (11:49) Jeron Harvey 9-yard run (Marco Capozzoli kick), Jacksonville 7–0
- Orlando – (7:39) Bobby Sippio 6-yard pass from Nick Hill (Mark Lewis kick), Tied 7–7
- Orlando – (3:01) Bobby Sippio 41-yard pass from Nick Hill (Mark Lewis kick), Orlando 14–7

2nd quarter

- Jacksonville – (12:38) Jeron Harvey 5-yard pass from Aaron Garcia (Marco Capozzoli kick failed), Orlando 14–13
- Orlando – (9:59) Josh Bush 26-yard pass from Nick Hill (Mark Lewis kick), Orlando 21–13
- Jacksonville – (6:48) Jomo Wilson 31-yard pass from Aaron Garcia (Marco Capozzoli kick), Orlando 21–20
- Jacksonville – (3:50) Jeron Harvey 9-yard pass from Aaron Garcia (Marco Capozzoli kick), Jacksonville 27–21
- Jacksonville – (1:00) Charles Hunt 26-yard interception return (Marco Capozzoli kick), Jacksonville 34–21
- Orlando – (0:55) James Lynch 2-yard run (Mark Lewis kick), Jacksonville 34–28
- Jacksonville – (0:38) Sale Key 41-yard pass from Aaron Garcia (Jeff Hughley rush failed), Jacksonville 40–28
- Orlando – (0:00) Bobby Sippio 9-yard pass from Nick Hill (Mark Lewis kick), Jacksonville 40–35

3rd quarter

- Orlando – (10:15) Josh Bush 9-yard pass from Nick Hill (Mark Lewis kick), Orlando 42–40
- Jacksonville – (4:50) Jomo Wilson 12-yard pass from Aaron Garcia (Marco Capozzoli kick), Jacksonville 47–42
- Jacksonville – (2:42) Jomo Wilson 10-yard pass from Aaron Garcia (Marco Capozzoli kick), Jacksonville 54–42

4th quarter

- Jacksonville – (13:53) Kirby Griffin 3-yard run (Marco Capozzoli kick), Jacksonville 61–42
- Jacksonville – (10:05) Jeff Hughley 8-yard fumble recovery (Marco Capozzoli kick failed), Jacksonville 67–42
- Jacksonville – (9:39) Team safety, Jacksonville 69–42
- Orlando – (4:47) Josh Bush 19-yard pass from Nick Hill (Mark Lewis kick), Jacksonville 69–49
- Jacksonville – (2:38) Kirby Griffin 4-yard run (Marco Capozzoli kick), Jacksonville 76–49
- Orlando – (0:22) Nick Hill 2-yard run (Nick Hill pass intercepted), Jacksonville 76–55

Passing

- Orlando – Nick Hill: 24/39, 266 yards, 6 TD, 2 INT
- Jacksonville – Aaron Garcia: 19/31, 274 yards, 6 TD, 2 INT

Rushing

- Orlando – Nick Hill: 6 att, 22 yards, 1 TD
- Jacksonville – Kirby Griffin: 3 att, 38 yards, 2 TD

Receiving

- Orlando – T.T. Toliver: 9 rec, 127 yards, 3 TD
- Jacksonville – Jeron Harvey: 7 rec, 105 yards, 2 TD

=== Week 9: at Philadelphia Soul ===
Week 9: Jacksonville Sharks at Philadelphia Soul – Game summary

Quarter	1	2	3	4	Total
Sharks	14	16	7	21	58
Soul	7	14	0	21	42

at Wells Fargo Center, Philadelphia, Pennsylvania

- Date: May 6
- Game time: 7:00 p.m. EDT
- Game attendance: 8,429
- Referee: Jim Corpora
- Recap

Game information

1st quarter

- Philadelphia – (8:29) Keith Stokes 28-yard pass from Ryan Vena (Robbie Smith kick), Philadelphia 7–0
- Jacksonville – (5:33) Jeron Harvey 20-yard pass from Aaron Garcia (Marco Capozzoli kick), Tied 7–7
- Jacksonville – (3:49) Jomo Wilson 29-yard pass from Aaron Garcia (Marco Capozzoli kick), Jacksonville 14–7

2nd quarter

- Jacksonville – (13:06) Jomo Wilson 8-yard pass from Aaron Garcia (Marco Capozzoli kick), Jacksonville 21–7
- Philadelphia – (11:21) Syvelle Newton 13-yard pass from Ryan Vena (Robbie Smith kick), Jacksonville 21–14
- Jacksonville – (1:13) Kirby Griffin 2-yard run (Marco Capozzoli rush fumbled), Jacksonville 27–14
- Philadelphia – (0:19) Donovan Morgan 7-yard pass from Ryan Vena (Robbie Smith kick), Jacksonville 27–21
- Jacksonville – (0:00) Marco Capozzoli 25-yard field goal, Jacksonville 30–21

3rd quarter

- Jacksonville – (3:16) Terrance Smith 41-yard interception return (Marco Capozzoli kick), Jacksonville 37–21

4th quarter

- Jacksonville – (9:56) Jeron Harvey 13-yard pass from Aaron Garcia (Marco Capozzoli kick), Jacksonville 44–21
- Philadelphia – (9:08) Keith Stokes 57-yard kickoff return (Robbie Smith kick), Jacksonville 44–28
- Jacksonville – (8:01) Jomo Wilson 4-yard pass from Aaron Garcia (Marco Capozzoli kick), Jacksonville 51–28
- Philadelphia – (5:26) Donovan Morgan 7-yard pass from Justin Allgood (Robbie Smith kick), Jacksonville 51–35
- Jacksonville – (4:04) Kirby Griffin 2-yard run (Marco Capozzoli kick), Jacksonville 58–35
- Philadelphia – (0:55) Larry Brackins 10-yard pass from Justin Allgood (Robbie Smith kick), Jacksonville 58–42

Passing

- Jacksonville – Aaron Garcia: 21/31, 271 yards, 5 TD
- Philadelphia – Justin Allgood: 8/15, 127 yards, 2 TD, 1 INT

Rushing

- Jacksonville – Kirby Griffin: 7 att, 12 yards, 2 TD
- Philadelphia – Darnell Whitley: 3 att, 7 yards

Receiving

- Jacksonville – Jomo Wilson: 11 rec, 148 yards, 3 TD
- Philadelphia – Donovan Morgan: 9 rec, 134 yards, 2 TD

=== Week 10: vs. Iowa Barnstormers ===
Week 10: Iowa Barnstormers at Jacksonville Sharks – Game summary

Quarter	1	2	3	4	Total
Barnstormers	7	6	7	7	27
Sharks	35	21	16	7	79

at Jacksonville Veterans Memorial Arena, Jacksonville, Florida

- Date: May 13
- Game time: 8:00 p.m. EDT
- Game attendance: 9,052
- Referee: Larry Smith
- Recap

Game information

1st quarter

- Jacksonville – (13:44) Jomo Wilson 31-yard pass from Aaron Garcia (Marco Capozzoli kick), Jacksonville 7–0
- Iowa – (9:38) Jesse Schmidt 12-yard pass from Brad Banks (Nick Pertuit kick), Tied 7–7
- Jacksonville – (8:21) Sale' Key 13-yard pass from Aaron Garcia (Marco Capozzoli kick), Jacksonville 14–7
- Jacksonville – (4:13) Sale' Key 30-yard pass from Aaron Garcia (Marco Capozzoli kick), Jacksonville 21–7
- Jacksonville – (2:42) Jomo Wilson 30-yard pass from Aaron Garcia (Marco Capozzoli kick), Jacksonville 28–7
- Jacksonville – (0:30) Terrance Smith 20-yard interception return (Marco Capozzoli kick), Jacksonville 35–7

2nd quarter

- Jacksonville – (9:31) Kirby Griffin 2-yard run (Marco Capozzoli kick), Jacksonville 42–7
- Jacksonville – (7:11) Jeron Harvey 8-yard pass from Aaron Garcia (Marco Capozzoli kick), Jacksonville 49–7
- Iowa – (0:56) Jesse Schmidt 18-yard pass from Brian Lee-Lauduski (Nick Pertuit kick failed), Jacksonville 49–13
- Jacksonville – (0:18) Jomo Wilson 16-yard pass from Aaron Garcia (Marco Capozzoli kick), Jacksonville 56–13

3rd quarter

- Jacksonville – (10:03) Ventrell Jenkins safety, Jacksonville 58–13
- Jacksonville – (7:39) Jeron Harvey 7-yard pass from Aaron Garcia (Marco Capozzoli kick), Jacksonville 65–13
- Iowa – (2:37) Todd Blythe 22-yard pass from Brian Lee-Lauduski (Nick Pertuit kick), Jacksonville 65–20
- Jacksonville – (1:19) Jomo Wilson 41-yard pass from Omar Jacobs (Marco Capozzoli kick), Jacksonville 72–20

4th quarter

- Iowa – (12:32) Todd Blythe 3-yard pass from Brian Lee-Lauduski (Nick Pertuit kick), Jacksonville 72–27
- Jacksonville – (9:36) Jeron Harvey 19-yard pass from Omar Jacobs (Marco Capozzoli kick), Jacksonville 79–27

Passing

- Iowa – Brian Lee-Lauduski: 13/27, 185 yards, 3 TD, 3 INT
- Jacksonville – Aaron Garcia: 12/17, 227 yards, 7 TD, 1 INT

Rushing

- Iowa – Brian Lee-Lauduski: 1 att, 4 yards
- Jacksonville – Kirby Griffin: 9 att, 18 yards, 1 TD

Receiving

- Iowa – Todd Blythe: 9 rec, 106 yards, 2 TD
- Jacksonville – Jomo Wilson: 5 rec, 132 yards, 4 TD

=== Week 11: at Georgia Force ===
Week 11: Jacksonville Sharks at Georgia Force – Game summary

Quarter	1	2	3	4	Total
Sharks	14	21	6	21	62
Force	7	24	7	17	55

at Arena at Gwinnett Center, Duluth, Georgia

- Date: May 21
- Game time: 7:35 p.m. EDT
- Game attendance: 4,301
- Referee: Chris Snead
- Recap

Game information

1st quarter

- Georgia – (13:23) Maurice Purify 41-yard pass from Brett Elliott (Carlos Martinez kick), Georgia 7–0
- Jacksonville – (8:07) Jomo Wilson 3-yard pass from Aaron Garcia (Marco Capozzoli kick), Tied 7–7
- Jacksonville – (2:54) Jomo Wilson 21-yard pass from Aaron Garcia (Marco Capozzoli kick), Jacksonville 14–7

2nd quarter

- Jacksonville – (14:57) Jomo Wilson 5-yard pass from Aaron Garcia (Marco Capozzoli kick), Jacksonville 21–7
- Georgia – (10:43) Maurice Purify 7-yard pass from Brett Elliott (Carlos Martinez kick), Jacksonville 21–14
- Jacksonville – (8:04) Jeron Harvey 26-yard pass from Aaron Garcia (Marco Capozzoli kick), Jacksonville 28–14
- Georgia – (4:53) Larry Shipp 31-yard pass from Brett Elliott (Carlos Martinez kick), Jacksonville 28–21
- Jacksonville – (3:45) Kirby Griffin 1-yard run (Marco Capozzoli kick), Jacksonville 35–21
- Georgia – (0:13) Carlos Martinez 33-yard field goal, Jacksonville 35–24
- Georgia – (0:09) Maurice Purify 4-yard pass from Brett Elliott (Carlos Martinez kick), Jacksonville 35–31

3rd quarter

- Georgia – (4:30) C.J. Johnson 7-yard pass from Brett Elliott (Carlos Martinez kick), Georgia 38–35
- Jacksonville – (1:42) Sale' Key 28-yard pass from Aaron Garcia (Marco Capozzoli kick failed), Jacksonville 41–38

4th quarter

- Georgia – (12:08) Maurice Purify 5-yard pass from Brett Elliott (Carlos Martinez kick), Georgia 45–41
- Jacksonville – (10:23) Jeron Harvey 37-yard pass from Aaron Garcia (Marco Capozzoli kick), Jacksonville 48–45
- Georgia – (6:05) Carlos Martinez 40-yard field goal, Tied 48–48
- Jacksonville – (4:26) Jeron Harvey 25-yard pass from Aaron Garcia (Marco Capozzoli kick failed), Jacksonville 54–48
- Georgia – (2:00) Larry Shipp 5-yard pass from Brett Elliott (Carlos Martinez kick), Georgia 55–54
- Jacksonville – (1:29) Jeron Harvey 11-yard pass from Aaron Garcia (Aaron Garcia pass), Jacksonville 62–55

Passing

- Jacksonville – Aaron Garcia: 22/29, 279 yards, 8 TD, 1 INT
- Georgia – Brett Elliott: 30/47, 283 yards, 7 TD, 1 INT

Rushing

- Jacksonville – Kirby Griffin: 9 att, 15 yards, 1 TD
- Georgia – Brett Elliott: 5 att, 18 yards

Receiving

- Jacksonville – Jeron Harvey: 5 rec, 97 yards, 4 TD
- Georgia – Larry Shipp: 11 rec, 126 yards, 2 TD

=== Week 13: at New Orleans VooDoo ===
Week 13: Jacksonville Sharks at New Orleans VooDoo – Game summary

Quarter	1	2	3	4	Total
Sharks	14	28	6	14	62
VooDoo	7	21	14	13	55

at New Orleans Arena, New Orleans, Louisiana

- Date: June 3
- Game time: 8:00 p.m. EDT
- Game attendance: 8,500
- Referee: David Cutaia
- Recap

Game information

1st quarter

- Jacksonville – (12:35) Kirby Griffin 1-yard run (Marco Capozzoli kick), Jacksonville 7–0
- New Orleans – (8:36) P.J. Berry 1-yard run (Jonathan Ruffin kick), Tied 7–7
- Jacksonville – (6:00) Jeron Harvey 3-yard pass from Aaron Garcia (Marco Capozzoli kick), Jacksonville 14–7

2nd quarter

- Jacksonville – (14:52) Jeron Harvey 19-yard pass from Aaron Garcia (Marco Capozzoli kick), Jacksonville 21–7
- New Orleans – (12:30) Skyler Green 25-yard pass from D. Bryant (Jonathan Ruffin kick), Jacksonville 21–14
- Jacksonville – (10:59) Jomo Wilson 12-yard pass from Aaron Garcia (Marco Capozzoli kick), Jacksonville 28–14
- Jacksonville – (9:04) Jeff Hughley 24-yard pass from Aaron Garcia (Marco Capozzoli kick), Jacksonville 35–14
- New Orleans – (8:12) Skyler Green 57-yard kickoff return (Jonathan Ruffin kick), Jacksonville 35–21
- Jacksonville – (6:31) Kirby Griffin 1-yard run (Marco Capozzoli kick), Jacksonville 42–21
- New Orleans – (0:22) Moqut Ruffins 3-yard pass from Danny Wimprine (Jonathan Ruffin kick), Jacksonville 42–28

3rd quarter

- New Orleans – (8:10) Skyler Green 42-yard pass from Danny Wimprine (Jonathan Ruffin kick), Jacksonville 42–35
- Jacksonville – (6:07) Jeron Harvey 26-yard pass from Aaron Garcia (Marco Capozzoli kick failed), Jacksonville 48–35
- New Orleans – (1:03) James Jordan 22-yard pass from Danny Wimprine (Jonathan Ruffin kick), Jacksonville 48–42

4th quarter

- Jacksonville – (12:12) Kirby Griffin 1-yard run (Marco Capozzoli kick), Jacksonville 55–42
- Jacksonville – (5:36) Kirby Griffin 1-yard run (Marco Capozzoli kick), Jacksonville 62–42
- New Orleans – (2:22) Skyler Green 9-yard pass from Danny Wimprine (Jonathan Ruffin kick), Jacksonville 62–49
- New Orleans – (0:05) Skyler Green 18-yard pass from Danny Wimprine (Jonathan Ruffin kick failed), Jacksonville 62–55

Passing

- Jacksonville – Aaron Garcia: 21/29, 240 yards, 5 TD, 1 INT
- New Orleans – Danny Wimprine: 17/30, 194 yards, 5 TD

Rushing

- Jacksonville – Kirby Griffin: 8 att, 7 yards, 4 TD
- New Orleans – Tom Taggert: 2 att, 25 yards

Receiving

- Jacksonville – Jeron Harvey: 9 rec, 106 yards, 3 TD
- New Orleans – Skyler Green: 8 rec, 132 yards, 4 TD

=== Week 14: at Orlando Predators ===
Week 14: Jacksonville Sharks at Orlando Predators – Game summary

Quarter	1	2	3	4	Total
Sharks	14	26	14	14	68
Predators	13	20	14	20	67

at Amway Center, Orlando, Florida

- Date: June 11
- Game time: 7:30 p.m. EDT
- Game attendance: 12,356
- Referee: Scott Vaughn
- Recap

Game information

1st quarter

- Jacksonville – (11:28) Jomo Wilson 21-yard pass from Aaron Garcia (Marco Capozzoli kick), Jacksonville 7–0
- Orlando – (9:47) Bobby Sippio 12-yard pass from Nick Hill (Mark Lewis kick failed), Jacksonville 7–6
- Jacksonville – (5:05) Jeron Harvey 3-yard pass from Aaron Garcia (Marco Capozzoli kick), Jacksonville 14–6
- Orlando – (0:09) T.T. Toliver 3-yard pass from Nick Hill (Mark Lewis kick), Jacksonville 14–13

2nd quarter

- Jacksonville – (9:28) Jeron Harvey 39-yard pass from Aaron Garcia (Marco Capozzoli kick), Jacksonville 21–13
- Orlando – (6:50) Bobby Sippio 19-yard pass from Nick Hill (Mark Lewis kick failed), Jacksonville 21–19
- Jacksonville – (4:22) Jeron Harvey 34-yard pass from Aaron Garcia (Marco Capozzoli kick failed), Jacksonville 27–19
- Orlando – (0:56) T.T. Toliver 22-yard pass from Nick Hill (Mark Lewis kick), Jacksonville 27–26
- Jacksonville – (0:46) Sale' Key 16-yard pass from Aaron Garcia (Marco Capozzoli kick failed), Jacksonville 33–26
- Orlando – (0:38) Bobby Sippio 4-yard pass from Nick Hill (Mark Lewis kick), Tied 33–33
- Jacksonville – (0:15) Jomo Wilson 11-yard pass from Aaron Garcia (Marco Capozzoli kick), Jacksonville 40–33

3rd quarter

- Jacksonville – (11:34) Sale' Key 10-yard pass from Aaron Garcia (Marco Capozzoli kick), Jacksonville 47–33
- Orlando – (8:43) Bobby Sippio 14-yard pass from Nick Hill (Mark Lewis kick), Jacksonville 47–40
- Jacksonville – (5:01) Jeron Harvey 4-yard run (Marco Capozzoli kick), Jacksonville 54–40
- Orlando – (0:50) Robert Quiroga 9-yard pass from Nick Hill (Mark Lewis kick), Jacksonville 54–47

4th quarter

- Jacksonville – (12:26) Jeron Harvey 7-yard pass from Aaron Garcia (Marco Capozzoli kick), Jacksonville 61–47
- Orlando – (7:49) Josh Bush 22-yard pass from Nick Hill (Mark Lewis kick), Jacksonville 61–54
- Orlando – (0:52) James Lynch 1-yard run (Mark Lewis kick), Tied 61–61
- Jacksonville – (0:23) Jamark Simmons 1-yard run (Marco Capozzoli kick), Jacksonville 68–61
- Orlando – (0:07) T.T. Toliver 33-yard pass from Nick Hill (Mark Lewis pass failed), Jacksonville 68–67

Passing

- Jacksonville – Aaron Garcia: 24/38, 329 yards, 8 TD
- Orlando – Nick Hill: 25/42, 361 yards, 9 TD, 1 INT

Rushing

- Jacksonville – Jeron Harvey: 1 att, 4 yards, 1 TD
- Orlando – Nick Hill: 5 att, 21 yards

Receiving

- Jacksonville – Jeron Harvey: 10 rec, 145 yards, 4 TD
- Orlando – T.T. Toliver: 9 rec, 134 yards, 3 TD

=== Week 15: vs. Milwaukee Mustangs ===
Week 15: Milwaukee Mustangs at Jacksonville Sharks – Game summary

Quarter	1	2	3	4	Total
Mustangs	7	13	14	13	47
Sharks	6	21	7	28	62

at Jacksonville Veterans Memorial Arena, Jacksonville, Florida

- Date: June 18
- Game time: 7:00 p.m. EDT
- Game attendance: 10,120
- Referee: Kevin Stine
- Recap

Game information

1st quarter

- Jacksonville – (10:30) Jomo Wilson 25-yard pass from Aaron Garcia (Marco Capozzoli kick failed), Jacksonville 6–0
- Milwaukee – (3:28) Dwayne Lefall 19-yard fumble recovery (Garrett Lindholm kick), Milwaukee 7–6

2nd quarter

- Jacksonville – (14:55) Jeff Hughley 7-yard pass from Aaron Garcia (Marco Capozzoli kick), Jacksonville 13–7
- Milwaukee – (8:19) Mykel Benson 1-yard run (Garrett Lindholm kick), Milwaukee 14–13
- Jacksonville – (4:11) Jamarko Simmons 1-yard run (Marco Capozzoli kick), Jacksonville 20–14
- Jacksonville – (0:55) Jomo Wilson 14-yard pass from Aaron Garcia (Marco Capozzoli kick), Jacksonville 27–14
- Milwaukee – (0:44) Mykel Benson 3-yard run (Garrett Lindholm kick failed), Jacksonville 27–20

3rd quarter

- Milwaukee – (6:16) Dwayne Eley Jr. 5-yard pass from R.J. Archer (Garrett Lindholm kick), Tied 27–27
- Jacksonville – (4:20) Jeff Hughley 28-yard pass from Aaron Garcia (Marco Capozzoli kick), Jacksonville 34–27
- Milwaukee – (3:16) Kelvin Rodgers 57-yard kickoff return (Garrett Lindholm kick), Tied 34–34

4th quarter

- Jacksonville – (13:25) Jomo Wilson 5-yard pass from Aaron Garcia (Marco Capozzoli kick failed), Jacksonville 40–34
- Jacksonville – (11:21) LaRoche Jackson 23-yard interception return (Jeff Hughley rush), Jacksonville 48–34
- Milwaukee – (6:47) Mykel Benson 1-yard run (Garrett Lindholm kick), Jacksonville 48–41
- Jacksonville – (5:06) Jamarko Simmons 13-yard pass from Aaron Garcia (Marco Capozzoli kick), Jacksonville 55–41
- Milwaukee – (1:04) Jason Jones 5-yard pass from R.J. Archer (Garrett Lindholm kick blocked), Jacksonville 55–47
- Jacksonville – (0:52) Jeff Hughley 7-yard pass from Aaron Garcia (Marco Capozzoli kick), Jacksonville 62–47

Passing

- Milwaukee – Brian Lee-Lauduski: 21/36, 186 yards, 2 TD, 2 INT
- Jacksonville – Aaron Garcia: 28/36, 307 yards, 7 TD, 1 INT

Rushing

- Milwaukee – Mykel Benson: 8 att, 9 yards, 3 TD
- Jacksonville – Jamarko Simmons: 1 att, 1 yard, 1 TD

Receiving

- Milwaukee – Dwayne Eley Jr.: 5 rec, 67 yards, 1 TD
- Jacksonville – Jeff Hughley: 12 rec, 147 yards, 3 TD

=== Week 16: vs. Tampa Bay Storm ===
Week 16: Tampa Bay Storm at Jacksonville Sharks – Game summary

Quarter	1	2	3	4	Total
Storm	21	7	6	7	41
Sharks	14	23	22	7	66

at Jacksonville Veterans Memorial Arena, Jacksonville, Florida

- Date: June 25
- Game time: 7:00 p.m. EDT
- Game attendance: 10,517
- Referee: Joe Pester
- Recap

Game information

1st quarter

- Tampa Bay – (11:14) Hank Edwards 6-yard pass from Brian Zbydniewski (Kyle Chilton kick), Tampa Bay 7–0
- Jacksonville – (9:45) Jeff Hughley 35-yard pass from Aaron Garcia (Marco Capozzoli kick), Tied 7–7
- Tampa Bay – (8:27) Amarri Jackson 45-yard pass from Brian Zbydniewski (Kyle Chilton kick), Tampa Bay 14–7
- Jacksonville – (5:58) Jamarko Simmons 16-yard pass from Aaron Garcia (Marco Capozzoli kick), Tied 14–14
- Tampa Bay – (1:54) Amarri Jackson 25-yard pass from Brian Zbydniewski (Kyle Chilton kick), Tampa Bay 21–14

2nd quarter

- Jacksonville – (13:55) Jamarko Simmons 2-yard pass from Aaron Garcia (Marco Capozzoli kick failed), Tampa Bay 21–20
- Jacksonville – (10:08) Jeff Hughley 10-yard pass from Aaron Garcia (Marco Capozzoli kick), Jacksonville 27–21
- Jacksonville – (4:05) Jomo Wilson 13-yard pass from Aaron Garcia (Marco Capozzoli kick), Jacksonville 34–21
- Tampa Bay – (0:43) Amarri Jackson 20-yard pass from Brian Zbydniewski (Kyle Chilton kick), Jacksonville 34–28
- Jacksonville – (0:07) Marco Capozzoli 18-yard field goal, Jacksonville 37–28

3rd quarter

- Jacksonville – (12:05) Jeff Hughley 4-yard pass from Aaron Garcia (Marco Capozzoli kick blocked), Jacksonville 43–28
- Jacksonville – (8:24) Jeff Hughley 5-yard pass from Aaron Garcia (Marco Capozzoli kick), Jacksonville 50–28
- Jacksonville – (4:54) Team safety, Jacksonville 52–28
- Jacksonville – (4:20) Jeff Hughley 45-yard pass from Aaron Garcia (Marco Capozzoli kick), Jacksonville 59–28
- Tampa Bay – (0:53) Hank Edwards 3-yard pass from Brian Zbydniewski (Kyle Chilton kick failed), Jacksonville 59–34

4th quarter

- Jacksonville – (13:40) Jeff Hughley 23-yard pass from Aaron Garcia (Marco Capozzoli kick), Jacksonville 66–34
- Tampa Bay – (8:39) Amarri Jackson 9-yard pass from Brian Zbydniewski (Kyle Chilton kick), Jacksonville 66–41

Passing

- Tampa Bay – Brian Zbydniewski: 27/44, 341 yards, 6 TD, 1 INT
- Jacksonville – Aaron Garcia: 22/27, 288 yards, 9 TD

Rushing

- Tampa Bay – Brian Zbydniewski: 4 att, 1 yard
- Jacksonville – Omar Jacobs: 1 att, 2 yards

Receiving

- Tampa Bay – Amarri Jackson: 14 rec, 187 yards, 4 TD
- Jacksonville – Jeff Hughley: 13 rec, 210 yards, 6 TD

=== Week 17: at San Jose SaberCats ===
Week 17: Jacksonville Sharks at San Jose SaberCats – Game summary

Quarter	1	2	3	4	Total
Sharks	14	28	7	21	70
SaberCats	14	14	28	27	83

at HP Pavilion at San Jose, San Jose, California

- Date: July 2
- Game time: 10:30 p.m. EDT
- Game attendance: 8,216
- Referee: Dave Cutaia
- Recap

Game information

1st quarter

- Jacksonville – (12:40) Jamarko Simmons 5-yard pass from Aaron Garcia (Marco Capozzoli kick), Jacksonville 7–0
- San Jose – (8:30) Mark Lewis 27-yard pass from Mark Grieb (Juan Gamboa kick), Tied 7–7
- Jacksonville – (5:43) Jamarko Simmons 1-yard run (Marco Capozzoli kick), Jacksonville 14–7
- San Jose – (1:17) Chad Cook 3-yard run (Juan Gamboa kick), Tied 14–14

2nd quarter

- Jacksonville – (13:40) Jomo Wilson 45-yard pass from Aaron Garcia (Marco Capozzoli kick), Jacksonville 21–14
- Jacksonville – (8:41) Jomo Wilson 12-yard pass from Aaron Garcia (Marco Capozzoli kick), Jacksonville 28–14
- San Jose – (4:10) Ben Nelson 4-yard pass from Mark Grieb (Juan Gamboa kick), Jacksonville 28–21
- Jacksonville – (2:38) Jomo Wilson 10-yard pass from Aaron Garcia (Marco Capozzoli kick), Jacksonville 35–21
- Jacksonville – (0:14) Jomo Wilson 20-yard pass from Aaron Garcia (Marco Capozzoli kick), Jacksonville 42–21
- San Jose – (0:02) Marco Thomas 24-yard pass from Mark Grieb (Juan Gamboa kick), Jacksonville 42–28

3rd quarter

- San Jose – (12:29) James Roe 12 yd pass from Mark Grieb (Juan Gamboa kick), Jacksonville 42–35
- Jacksonville – (7:34) Jeff Hughley 18-yard pass from Aaron Garcia (Marco Capozzoli kick), Jacksonville 49–35
- San Jose – (5:03) Chad Cook 34-yard pass from Mark Grieb (Juan Gamboa kick), Jacksonville 49–42
- San Jose – (4:14) Kai Ellis 0-yard fumble recovery (Juan Gamboa kick), Tied 49–49
- San Jose – (1:32) James Roe 6-yard pass from Mark Grieb (Juan Gamboa kick), San Jose 56–49

4th quarter

- Jacksonville – (12:31) Jamarko Simmons 12-yard pass from Aaron Garcia (Marco Capozzoli kick), Tied 56–56
- San Jose – (7:16) Mark Grieb 4-yard run (Juan Gamboa kick), San Jose 63–56
- San Jose – (3:32) Ben Nelson 29-yard pass from Mark Grieb (Juan Gamboa kick), San Jose 70–56
- Jacksonville – (1:13) Jomo Wilson 12-yard pass from Aaron Garcia (Marco Capozzoli kick), San Jose 70–63
- San Jose – (0:52) Chad Cook 26-yard pass from Mark Grieb (Juan Gamboa kick), San Jose 77–63
- Jacksonville – (0:25) Jamarko Simmons 11-yard pass from Aaron Garcia (Marco Capozzoli kick), San Jose 77–70
- San Jose – (0:18) James Roe 9-yard pass from Mark Grieb (Juan Gamboa kick blocked), San Jose 83–70

Passing

- Jacksonville – Aaron Garcia: 27/34, 354 yards, 9 TD, 1 INT
- San Jose – Mark Grieb: 32/48, 401 yards, 9 TD, 2 INT

Rushing

- Jacksonville – Kirby Griffin: 3 att, 20 yards
- San Jose – Mark Grieb: 2 att, 4 yards, 1 TD

Receiving

- Jacksonville – Jomo Wilson: 10 rec, 134 yards, 5 TD
- San Jose – James Roe: 12 rec, 139 yards, 3 TD

=== Week 18: vs. Dallas Vigilantes ===
Week 18: Dallas Vigilantes at Jacksonville Sharks – Game summary

Quarter	1	2	3	4	Total
Vigilantes	14	27	21	13	75
Sharks	7	29	19	15	70

at Jacksonville Veterans Memorial Arena, Jacksonville, Florida

- Date: July 9
- Game time: 7:00 p.m. EDT
- Game attendance: 11,153
- Referee: Kevin Stine
- Recap

Game information

1st quarter

- Dallas – (9:03) Derrick Ross 3-yard run (Remy Hamilton kick), Dallas 7–0
- Dallas – (5:32) Anthony Jones 29-yard pass from Dan Raudabaugh (Remy Hamilton kick), Dallas 14–0
- Jacksonville – (1:23) Jeff Hughley 43-yard pass from Aaron Garcia (Marco Capozzoli kick), Dallas 14–7

2nd quarter

- Jacksonville – (13:21) JaVonte Holmes 28-yard interception return (Marco Capozzoli kick), Tied 14–14
- Dallas – (11:03) Dan Raudabaugh 21-yard pass from Dan Raudabaugh (Remy Hamilton kick), Dallas 21–14
- Jacksonville – (7:09) Kirby Griffin 2-yard run (Marco Capozzoli kick), Tied 21–21
- Dallas – (4:03) Anthony Jones 20-yard pass from Dan Raudabaugh (Remy Hamilton kick), Dallas 28–21
- Jacksonville – (1:46) Jeff Hughley 11-yard pass from Aaron Garcia (Marco Capozzoli kick failed), Dallas 28–27
- Dallas – (0:46) Derrick Ross 1-yard run (Remy Hamilton kick), Dallas 35–27
- Jacksonville – (0:24) Jeff Hughley 24-yard pass from Aaron Garcia (Marco Capozzoli kick), Dallas 35–34
- Dallas – (0:00) Derrick Ross 1-yard run (Remy Hamilton kick blocked), Dallas 41–34
- Jacksonville – (0:00) Jerry Brown PAT return, Dallas 41–36

3rd quarter

- Dallas – (12:47) DeAndrew Rubin 26-yard pass from Dan Raudabaugh (Remy Hamilton kick), Dallas 48–36
- Jacksonville – (9:46) Jomo Wilson 4-yard pass from Aaron Garcia (Marco Capozzoli kick failed), Dallas 48–42
- Dallas – (6:00) Anthony Jones 8-yard pass from Dan Raudabaugh (Remy Hamilton kick), Dallas 55–42
- Jacksonville – (2:53) Jomo Wilson 14-yard pass from Aaron Garcia (Marco Capozzoli kick), Dallas 55–49
- Dallas – (1:32) Anthony Jones 8-yard pass from Dan Raudabaugh (Remy Hamilton kick), Dallas 62–49
- Jacksonville – (0:11) Jomo Wilson 1-yard run (Jeff Hughley rush failed), Dallas 62–55

4th quarter

- Jacksonville – (10:18) Jeff Hughley 14-yard pass from Aaron Garcia (Marco Capozzoli kick), Tied 62–62
- Jacksonville – (9:13) Richard Clebert safety, Jacksonville 64–62
- Dallas – (4:39) DeAndrew Rubin 23-yard pass from Dan Raudabaugh (Remy Hamilton kick), Dallas 69–64
- Dallas – (1:51) Anthony Jones 16-yard pass from Dan Raudabaugh (Dan Raudabaugh pass failed), Dallas 75–64
- Jacksonville – (0:27) Jomo Wilson 8-yard pass from Aaron Garcia (Aaron Garcia pass failed), Dallas 75–70

Passing

- Dallas – Dan Raudabaugh: 29/39, 365 yards, 8 TD, 1 INT
- Jacksonville – Aaron Garcia: 21/35, 275 yards, 7 TD, 3 INT

Rushing

- Dallas – Derrick Ross: 10 att, 15 yards, 3 TD
- Jacksonville – Kirby Griffin: 3 att, 16 yards, 1 TD

Receiving

- Dallas – Anthony Jones: 17 rec, 208 yards, 5 TD
- Jacksonville – Jeff Hughley: 9 rec, 138 yards, 4 TD

=== Week 19: at Kansas City Command ===
Week 19: Jacksonville Sharks at Kansas City Command – Game summary

Quarter	1	2	3	4	OT	Total
Sharks	6	21	0	15	6	48
Command	0	21	12	9	7	49

at Sprint Center, Kansas City, Missouri

- Date: July 15
- Game time: 8:30 p.m. EDT
- Referee: Larry Smith
- Recap

Game information

1st quarter

- Jacksonville – (9:17) Jeff Hughley 4-yard pass from Aaron Garcia (Marco Capozzoli kick failed), Jacksonville 6–0

2nd quarter

- Kansas City – (9:01) Bret Smith 16-yard pass from Steve Wasil (Brian Umstead kick), Kansas City 7–6
- Jacksonville – (5:39) Jeff Hughley 14-yard pass from Aaron Garcia (Marco Capozzoli kick), Jacksonville 13–7
- Kansas City – (4:26) Brent Holmes 45-yard pass from Steve Wasil (Brian Umstead kick), Kansas City 14–13
- Jacksonville – (2:08) Sale' Key 7-yard pass from Aaron Garcia (Marco Capozzoli kick), Jacksonville 20–14
- Kansas City – (0:57) Trey Bryant 11-yard run (Brian Umstead kick), Kansas City 21–20
- Jacksonville – (0:00) Kirby Griffin 1-yard run (Marco Capozzoli kick), Jacksonville 27–21

3rd quarter

- Kansas City – (13:19) Bret Smith 24-yard pass from Steve Wasil (Brian Umstead kick failed), Tied 27–27
- Kansas City – (12:34) Bradley Chavez 3-yard net recovery (Brian Umstead kick blocked), Kansas City 33–27

4th quarter

- Kansas City – (11:34) Trey Bryant 5-yard run (Brian Umstead kick failed), Kansas City 39–27
- Jacksonville – (9:28) Jomo Wilson 27-yard pass from Aaron Garcia (Marco Capozzoli kick failed), Kansas City 39–33
- Kansas City – (3:27) Brian Umstead 19-yard field goal, Kansas City 42–33
- Jacksonville – (1:57) Sale' Key 25-yard pass from Aaron Garcia (Marco Capozzoli kick blocked), Kansas City 42–39
- Jacksonville – (0:00) Marco Capozzoli 21-yard field goal, Tied 42–42

Overtime

- Kansas City – Brent Holmes 29-yard pass from Steve Wasil (Brian Umstead kick), Kansas City 49–42
- Jacksonville – Jeff Hughley 6-yard pass from Aaron Garcia (Aaron Garcia pass failed), Kansas City 49–48

Passing

- Jacksonville – Aaron Garcia: 37/48, 419 yards, 6 TD, 2 INT
- Kansas City – Steve Wasil: 19/34, 309 yards, 4 TD, 1 INT

Rushing

- Jacksonville – Kirby Griffin: 5 att, 2 yards, 1 TD
- Kansas City – Trey Bryant: 8 att, 28 yards, 2 TD

Receiving

- Jacksonville – Jeff Hughley: 18 rec, 176 yards, 3 TD
- Kansas City – Brent Holmes: 6 rec, 127 yards, 2 TD

=== Week 20: vs. Spokane Shock ===
Week 20: Spokane Shock at Jacksonville Sharks – Game summary

Quarter	1	2	3	4	Total
Shock	8	18	14	16	56
Sharks	13	20	21	21	75

at Jacksonville Veterans Memorial Arena, Jacksonville, Florida

- Date: July 22
- Game time: 8:00 p.m. EDT
- Game attendance: 10,025
- Referee: Scott Vaughn
- Recap

Game information

1st quarter

- Jacksonville – (15:00) Jeff Hughley 57-yard kickoff return (Marco Capozzoli kick), Jacksonville 7–0
- Spokane – (10:42) Randy Hymes 11-yard pass from Kyle Rowley (Taylor Rowan drop-kick), Spokane 8–7
- Jacksonville – (3:21) Jamarko Simmons 4-yard pass from Aaron Garcia (Marco Capozzoli kick failed), Jacksonville 13–8

2nd quarter

- Spokane – (14:54) Chris Pino 17-yard pass from Kyle Rowley (Taylor Rowan drop-kick failed), Spokane 14–13
- Spokane – (6:40) Taylor Rowan 23-yard field goal, Spokane 17–13
- Jacksonville – (5:29) Jeff Hughley 31-yard pass from Aaron Garcia (Marco Capozzoli kick), Jacksonville 20–17
- Spokane – (1:12) Adron Tennell 7-yard pass from Kyle Rowley (Taylor Rowan kick blocked), Spokane 23–20
- Jacksonville – (0:55) Jamarko Simmons 9-yard pass from Aaron Garcia (Marco Capozzoli kick failed), Jacksonville 26–23
- Spokane – (0:38) Taylor Rowan 18-yard field goal, Tied 26–26
- Jacksonville – (0:28) Jomo Wilson 8-yard pass from Aaron Garcia (Marco Capozzoli kick), Jacksonville 33–26

3rd quarter

- Jacksonville – (11:17) Kevin Concepcion 31-yard pass from Omar Jacobs (Marco Capozzoli kick), Jacksonville 40–26
- Spokane – (8:53) Greg Orton 45-yard pass from Kyle Rowley (Taylor Rowan kick), Jacksonville 40–33
- Jacksonville – (6:33) Jeff Hughley 19-yard pass from Omar Jacobs (Marco Capozzoli kick), Jacksonville 47–33
- Jacksonville – (4:16) Jamarko Simmons 19-yard pass from Omar Jacobs (Marco Capozzoli kick), Jacksonville 54–33
- Spokane – (0:02) Greg Orton 1-yard pass from Steven Sheffield (Taylor Rowan kick), Jacksonville 54–40

4th quarter

- Jacksonville – (14:18) Jamarko Simmons 6-yard pass from Omar Jacobs (Marco Capozzoli kick), Jacksonville 61–40
- Spokane – (11:52) Greg Orton 36-yard pass from Steven Sheffield (Steven Sheffield rush), Jacksonville 61–48
- Jacksonville – (9:33) Jamarko Simmons 1-yard run (Marco Capozzoli kick), Jacksonville 68–48
- Jacksonville – (5:53) Sale' Key 36-yard interception return (Marco Capozzoli kick), Jacksonville 75–48
- Spokane – (2:10) Randy Hymes 7-yard pass from Steven Sheffield (Steven Sheffield pass), Jacksonville 75–56

Passing

- Spokane – Kyle Rowley: 23/36, 251 yards, 4 TD, 1 INT
- Jacksonville – Aaron Garcia: 12/20, 117 yards, 4 TD

Rushing

- Spokane – Micah King: 3 att, 11 yards
- Jacksonville – Omar Jacobs: 2 att, 2 yards

Receiving

- Spokane – Greg Orton: 8 rec, 119 yards, 3 TD
- Jacksonville – Jeff Hughley: 7 rec, 98 yards, 2 TD

== Playoffs ==
=== American Conference Semifinals: vs. (4) Orlando Predators ===
American Conference Semifinals: Orlando Predators at Jacksonville Sharks – Game summary

Quarter	1	2	3	4	Total
(4) Predators	7	13	7	21	48
(1) Sharks	14	14	14	21	63

at Jacksonville Veterans Memorial Arena, Jacksonville, Florida

- Date: July 29
- Game time: 8:00 p.m. EDT
- Game attendance: 10,189
- Recap

Game information

1st quarter

- Jacksonville – (15:00) Jeff Hughley 57 yd kickoff return (Marco Capozzoli kick), Jacksonville 7–0
- Orlando – (9:20) Nick Hill 10 yd run (Mark Lewis kick), Tied 7–7
- Jacksonville – (4:56) Jamarko Simmons 1 yd run (Marco Capozzoli kick), Jacksonville 14–7

2nd quarter

- Orlando – (13:38) Robert Quiroga 4 yd pass from Nick Hill (Mark Lewis kick), Jacksonville 14–13
- Jacksonville – (7:56) Jeron Harvey 4 yd pass from Aaron Garcia (Marco Capozzoli kick), Jacksonville 21–13
- Jacksonville – (2:59) Kirby Griffin 1 yd run (Marco Capozzoli kick), Jacksonville 28–13
- Orlando – (0:08) Bobby Sippio 13 yd pass from Nick Hill (Mark Lewis kick), Jacksonville 28–20

3rd quarter

- Orlando – (11:01) T.T. Toliver 11 yd pass from Nick Hill (Mark Lewis kick), Jacksonville 28–27
- Jacksonville – (10:03) Jeff Hughley 57 yd kickoff return (Marco Capozzoli kick), Jacksonville 35–27
- Jacksonville – (1:13) Jamarko Simmons 1 yd run (Marco Capozzoli kick), Jacksonville 42–27

4th quarter

- Jacksonville – (12:23) Jeron Harvey 10 yd pass from Aaron Garcia (Marco Capozzoli kick), Jacksonville 49–27
- Orlando – (7:48) Julius Wilson 3 yd pass from Nick Hill (Collin Drafts rush), Jacksonville 49–35
- Orlando – (5:42) T.T. Toliver 24 yd pass from Nick Hill (Mark Lewis kick), Jacksonville 49–42
- Jacksonville – (4:08) Jeron Harvey 11 yd pass from Aaron Garcia (Marco Capozzoli kick), Jacksonville 56–42
- Orlando – (2:23) T.T. Toliver 41 yd pass from Nick Hill (Mark Lewis kick failed), Jacksonville 56–48
- Jacksonville – (1:07) Jomo Wilson 17 yd pass from Aaron Garcia (Marco Capozzoli kick), Jacksonville 63–48

Passing

- Orlando – Nick Hill: 27/49, 311 yards, 6 TD, 2 INT
- Jacksonville – Aaron Garcia: 15/19, 148 yards, 4 TD, 1 INT

Rushing

- Orlando – Nick Hill: 3 att, 15 yards, 1 TD
- Jacksonville – Kirby Griffin: 8 att, 38 yards, 1 TD

Receiving

- Orlando – T.T. Toliver: 5 rec, 96 yards, 3 TD
- Jacksonville – Jomo Wilson: 7 rec, 72 yards, 1 TD

=== American Conference Championship: vs. (3) Georgia Force ===
American Conference Championship: Georgia Force at Jacksonville Sharks – Game summary

Quarter	1	2	3	4	Total
(3) Force	14	20	7	14	55
(1) Sharks	13	27	14	10	64

at Jacksonville Veterans Memorial Arena, Jacksonville, Florida

- Date: August 8
- Game time: 8:00 p.m. EDT
- Game attendance: 10,891
- Referee: David Cutaia
- Recap

Game information

1st quarter

- Jacksonville – (13:10) Jeron Harvey 10-yard pass from Aaron Garcia (Aaron Garcia pass failed), Jacksonville 6–0
- Georgia – (7:48) Mike Johnson 4-yard pass from Darnell Kennedy (Carlos Martinez kick), Georgia 7–6
- Jacksonville – (4:08) Jamarko Simmons 2-yard run (Marco Capozzoli kick), Jacksonville 13–7
- Georgia – (0:21) Maurice Purify 5-yard pass from Darnell Kennedy (Carlos Martinez kick), Georgia 14–13

2nd quarter

- Jacksonville – (13:23) Jeff Hughley 35-yard pass from Aaron Garcia (Marco Capozzoli kick), Jacksonville 20–14
- Georgia – (10:41) Maurice Purify 25-yard pass from Darnell Kennedy (Carlos Martinez kick), Georgia 21–20
- Jacksonville – (7:37) Jamarko Simmons 5-yard pass from Aaron Garcia (Marco Capozzoli kick), Jacksonville 27–21
- Georgia – (5:18) C.J. Johnson 31-yard pass from Darnell Kennedy (Carlos Martinez kick), Georgia 28–27
- Jacksonville – (2:57) Jeff Hughley 35-yard pass from Aaron Garcia (Marco Capozzoli kick failed), Jacksonville 33–28
- Georgia – (0:38) Mike Johnson 4-yard pass from Darnell Kennedy (Carlos Martinez kick failed), Georgia 34–33
- Jacksonville – (0:09) Jomo Wilson 19-yard pass from Aaron Garcia (Marco Capozzoli kick), Jacksonville 40–34

3rd quarter

- Jacksonville – (11:19) Jeron Harvey 17-yard pass from Aaron Garcia (Marco Capozzoli kick), Jacksonville 47–34
- Georgia – (5:07) C.J. Johnson 5-yard pass from Darnell Kennedy (Carlos Martinez kick), Jacksonville 47–41
- Jacksonville – (2:13) Jamarko Simmons 9-yard pass from Aaron Garcia (Marco Capozzoli kick), Jacksonville 54–41

4th quarter

- Georgia – (12:38) Mike Johnson 4-yard pass from Darnell Kennedy (Carlos Martinez kick), Jacksonville 54–48
- Jacksonville – (11:19) Jeff Hughley 39-yard pass from Aaron Garcia (Marco Capozzoli kick), Jacksonville 61–48
- Georgia – (5:13) Maurice Purify 11-yard pass from Darnell Kennedy (Carlos Martinez kick), Jacksonville 61–55
- Jacksonville – (0:59) Marco Capozzoli 36-yard field goal, Jacksonville 64–55

Passing

- Georgia – Darnell Kennedy: 29/48, 313 yards, 8 TD, 1 INT
- Jacksonville – Aaron Garcia: 22/28, 313 yards, 8 TD

Rushing

- Georgia – Darnell Kennedy: 2 att, 6 yards
- Jacksonville – Jamarko Simmons: 1 att, 5 yards, 1 TD

Receiving

- Georgia – Maurice Purify: 13 rec, 153 yards, 3 TD
- Jacksonville – Jeff Hughley: 7 rec, 168 yards, 3 TD

=== ArenaBowl XXIV: at (N1) Arizona Rattlers ===
ArenaBowl XXIV: Jacksonville Sharks at Arizona Rattlers – Game summary

Quarter	1	2	3	4	Total
(A1) Sharks	12	20	6	35	73
(N1) Rattlers	14	21	7	28	70

at US Airways Center, Phoenix, Arizona

- Date: August 12
- Game time: 8:30 p.m. EDT
- Game attendance: 14,320
- Referee: Shawn Hochuli
- Recap

Game information

1st quarter

- Arizona – (11:32) Odie Armstrong 2-yard run (Jason Witczak kick), Arizone 7–0
- Jacksonville – (10:23) Jomo Wilson 41-yard pass from Aaron Garcia (Marco Capozzoli kick failed), Arizona 7–6
- Arizona – (5:32) Kerry Reed 20-yard pass from Nick Davila (Jason Witczak kick), Arizona 14–6
- Jacksonville – (2:45) Jeron Harvey 11-yard pass from Aaron Garcia (Marco Capozzoli kick failed), Arizona 14–12

2nd quarter

- Jacksonville – (12:42) Jomo Wilson 0-yard fumble recovery (Marco Capozzoli kick), Jacksonville 19–14
- Arizona – (7:40) Chris Jackson 4-yard pass from Nick Davila (Jason Witczak kick), Arizona 21–19
- Jacksonville – (5:17) Jeff Hughley 31-yard pass from Aaron Garcia (Marco Capozzoli kick), Jacksonville 26–21
- Jacksonville – (2:54) Jamarko Simmons 1-yard run (Marco Capozzoli pass failed), Jacksonville 32–21
- Arizona – (0:55) Chris Jackson 18-yard pass from Nick Davila (Jason Witczak kick), Jacksonville 32–28
- Arizona – (0:12) Jason Geathers 16-yard pass from Nick Davila (Jason Witczak kick), Arizona 35–32

3rd quarter

- Arizona – (6:09) Odie Armstrong 9-yard pass from Nick Davila (Jason Witczak kick), Arizona 42–32
- Jacksonville – (1:56) Jamarko Simmons 3-yard pass from Aaron Garcia (Marco Capozzoli kick failed), Arizona 42–38

4th quarter

- Arizona – (13:21) Odie Armstrong 1-yard run (Jason Witczak kick), Arizona 49–38
- Jacksonville – (9:59) Jamarko Simmons 7-yard pass from Aaron Garcia (Marco Capozzoli kick), Arizona 49–45
- Jacksonville – (5:22) Kirby Griffin 4-yard run (Aaron Garcia pass), Jacksonville 53–49
- Arizona – (3:58) Jason Geathers 17-yard pass from Nick Davila (Jason Witczak kick), Arizona 56–53
- Jacksonville – (1:26) Jeron Harvey 45-yard pass from Aaron Garcia (Marco Capozzoli kick), Jacksonville 60–56
- Arizona – (0:52) Chris Jackson 5-yard pass from Nick Davila (Jason Witczak kick), Arizona 63–60
- Jacksonville – (0:40) Jomo Wilson 11-yard pass from Aaron Garcia (Marco Capozzoli kick), Jacksonville 67–63
- Arizona – (0:21) Kerry Reed 12-yard pass from Nick Davila (Jason Witczak kick), Arizona 70–67
- Jacksonville – (0:00) Jeron Harvey 10-yard pass from Aaron Garcia, Jacksonville 73–70

Passing

- Jacksonville – Aaron Garcia: 28/42, 402 yards, 8 TD
- Arizona – Nick Davila: 25/40, 338 yards, 8 TD, 1 INT

Rushing

- Jacksonville – Kirby Griffin: 7 att, 13 yards, 1 TD
- Arizona – Odie Armstrong: 3 att, 6 yards, 2 TD

Receiving

- Jacksonville – Jomo Wilson: 9 rec, 138 yards, 2 TD
- Arizona – Chris Jackson: 10 rec, 136 yards, 3 TD
