= 2011 Spokane Shock season =

Arena Football League team season

- Head coach: Rob Keefe
- Home stadium: Spokane Veterans Memorial Arena

Results
- Record: 9–9
- Division place: 2nd NC West
- Playoffs: Lost Conference Semifinals (Rattlers) 33–62

The 2011 Spokane Shock season was the sixth season for the franchise, and the second in the Arena Football League, coming off of their victory in ArenaBowl XXIII. The team was coached by Rob Keefe and played their home games at Spokane Veterans Memorial Arena. The Shock finished the regular season 9–9, qualifying for the playoffs as the 4th seed in the National Conference. They lost to the Arizona Rattlers in the conference semifinals, 33–62.

== Standings ==
West Division
Team	W	L	PCT	PF	PA	DIV	CON	Home	Away
z-Arizona Rattlers	16	2	.889	1114	836	5–1	9–2	8–1	8–1
x-Spokane Shock	9	9	.500	1057	1027	3–3	6–5	7–2	2–7
Utah Blaze	9	9	.500	1082	1117	2–4	4–7	7–2	2–7
San Jose SaberCats	7	11	.389	1022	1080	2–4	4–7	6–3	1–8

z - Clinched division and conference's best record
x - Clinched playoff berth

== Schedule ==
=== Regular season ===
The Shock began the season on the road on March 11 against the San Jose SaberCats. Their home opener was against the Cleveland Gladiators on March 19. They visited the Jacksonville Sharks in their final regular season game on July 22.

Week	Day	Date	Kickoff	Opponent	Results		Location	Report
Week	Day	Date	Kickoff	Opponent	Score	Record	Location	Report
1	Friday	March 11	7:30 p.m. PST	at San Jose SaberCats	L 48–76	0–1	HP Pavilion at San Jose	
2	Saturday	March 19	7:00 p.m. PDT	Cleveland Gladiators	L 55–61	0–2	Spokane Veterans Memorial Arena	
3	Friday	March 25	5:00 p.m. PDT	at Iowa Barnstormers	L 42–43	0–3	Wells Fargo Arena	
4	Friday	April 1	8:00 p.m. PDT	Kansas City Command	W 64–31	1–3	Spokane Veterans Memorial Arena	
5	Bye							
6	Friday	April 15	2:00 p.m. PDT	at Utah Blaze	L 62–69	1–4	EnergySolutions Arena	
7	Saturday	April 23	4:30 p.m. PDT	at Orlando Predators	W 70–58	2–4	Amway Center	
8	Saturday	April 30	7:00 p.m. PDT	Arizona Rattlers	W 70–69	3–4	Spokane Veterans Memorial Arena	
9	Saturday	May 7	5:00 p.m. PDT	at Pittsburgh Power	L 41–51	3–5	Consol Energy Center	
10	Saturday	May 14	7:00 p.m. PDT	Dallas Vigilantes	W 71–49	4–5	Spokane Veterans Memorial Arena	
11	Friday	May 20	8:00 p.m. PDT	Tampa Bay Storm	L 42–51	4–6	Spokane Veterans Memorial Arena	
12	Saturday	May 28	5:00 p.m. PDT	at Kansas City Command	L 42–45	4–7	Sprint Center	
13	Bye							
14	Friday	June 10	5:00 p.m. PDT	Philadelphia Soul	W 75–54	5–7	Spokane Veterans Memorial Arena	
15	Saturday	June 18	7:00 p.m. PDT	Chicago Rush	W 63–60	6–7	Spokane Veterans Memorial Arena	
16	Saturday	June 25	5:00 p.m. PDT	at New Orleans VooDoo	W 75–54	7–7	New Orleans Arena	
17	Saturday	July 2	5:05 p.m. PDT	at Arizona Rattlers	L 46–68	7–8	US Airways Center	
18	Saturday	July 9	6:00 p.m. PDT	Utah Blaze	W 76–49	8–8	Joe Albi Stadium	
19	Saturday	July 16	7:00 p.m. PDT	San Jose SaberCats	W 63–61	9–8	Spokane Veterans Memorial Arena	
20	Friday	July 22	5:00 p.m. PDT	Jacksonville Sharks	L 56–75	9–9	Jacksonville Veterans Memorial Arena	

=== Playoffs ===
Round	Day	Date	Kickoff	Opponent	Results	Location	Report
NC Semifinals	Friday	July 29	7:00 p.m. PDT	at Arizona Rattlers	L 33–62	US Airways Center	

== Regular season ==
=== Week 1: at San Jose SaberCats ===
Week 1: Spokane Shock at San Jose SaberCats – Game summary

Quarter	1	2	3	4	Total
Shock	14	13	7	14	48
SaberCats	27	21	7	21	76

at HP Pavilion at San Jose, San Jose, California

- Date: March 11
- Game time: 7:30 p.m. PST
- Game attendance: 10,563
- Referee: David Cutaia
- Recap

Game information

1st quarter

- San Jose – (13:29) Rodney Wright 25-yard pass from Mark Grieb (Juan Gamboa kick), San Jose 7–0
- San Jose – (10:59) Courtney Smith 16-yard interception return (Juan Gamboa kick), San Jose 14–0
- Spokane – (8:04) Markee White 2-yard pass from Kyle Rowley (Taylor Rowan kick), San Jose 14–7
- San Jose – (5:55) Nichir Flowers 7-yard pass from Mark Grieb (Juan Gamboa kick blocked), San Jose 20–7
- Spokane – (1:30) Markee White 24-yard pass from Kyle Rowley (Taylor Rowan kick), San Jose 20–14
- San Jose – (0:20) Samora Goodson 25-yard pass from Mark Grieb (Juan Gamboa kick), San Jose 27–14

2nd quarter

- San Jose – (10:56) Dwight Mclean 46-yard interception return (Juan Gamboa kick), San Jose 34–14
- San Jose – (2:42) Chad Cook 1-yard run (Juan Gamboa kick), San Jose 41–14
- Spokane – (1:46) Terran Sanders 56-yard kickoff return (Kyle Rowley run failed), San Jose 41–20
- San Jose – (0:45) Nichir Flowers 8-yard pass from Mark Grieb (Juan Gamboa kick), San Jose 48–20
- Spokane – (0:02) Kyle Rowley 1-yard run (Taylor Rowan kick), San Jose 48–27

3rd quarter

- Spokane – (13:00 Raul Vijil 25-yard pass from Kyle Rowley (Taylor Rowan kick), San Jose 48–34
- San Jose – (7:17) Chad Cook 1-yard run (Juan Gamboa kick), San Jose 55–34

4th quarter

- San Jose – (14:57) Chad Cook 1-yard run (Juan Gamboa kick), San Jose 62–34
- Spokane – (10:52) Greg Orton 2-yard pass from Kyle Rowley (Taylor Rowan kick), San Jose 62–41
- San Jose – (9:58) Nichir Flowers 5-yard pass from Mark Grieb (Juan Gamboa kick), San Jose 69–41
- Spokane – (7:03) Greg Orton 29-yard pass from Kyle Rowley (Taylor Rowan kick), San Jose 69–48
- San Jose – (4:39) Nichir Flowers 9-yard pass from Mark Grieb (Juan Gamboa kick), San Jose 76–48

Passing

- Spokane – Kyle Rowley: 30/47, 364 yards, 5 TD, 3 INT
- San Jose – Mark Grieb: 21/15, 222 yards, 6 TD

Rushing

- Spokane – Kyle Rowley: 1 att, 1 yard, 1 TD
- San Jose – Chad Cook: 11 att, 21 yards, 3 TD

Receiving

- Spokane – Raul Vijil: 13 rec, 161 yards, 1 TD
- San Jose – Rodney Wright: 12 rec, 123 yards, 1 TD

=== Week 2: vs. Cleveland Gladiators ===
Week 2: Cleveland Gladiators at Spokane Shock – Game summary

Quarter	1	2	3	4	Total
Gladiators	14	14	13	20	61
Shock	7	21	6	21	55

at Spokane Veterans Memorial Arena, Spokane, Washington

- Date: March 19
- Game time: 5:00 p.m. PDT
- Game attendance: 10,140
- Referee: Shane Anderson
- Recap

Game information

1st quarter

- Cleveland – (11:25) Troy Bergeron 14-yard pass from John Dutton (Matt Denny kick), Cleveland 7–0
- Spokane – (5:56) Kyle Rowley 1-yard run (Taylor Rownan kick), Tied 7–7
- Cleveland – (3:07) Troy Bergeron 15-yard pass from John Dutton (Matt Denny kick), Cleveland 14–7

2nd quarter

- Spokane – (14:10) Emery Sammons 3-yard pass from Kyle Rowley (Taylor Rownan kick), Tied 14–14
- Cleveland – (12:58) Victor Williams 45-yard pass from John Dutton (Matt Denny kick), Cleveland 21–14
- Spokane – (8:45) Markee White 11-yard pass from Kyle Rowley (Taylor Rownan kick), Tied 21–21
- Spokane – (3:10) Greg Orton 10-yard pass from Kyle Rowley (Taylor Rownan kick), Spokane 28–21
- Cleveland – (0:08) Robert Redd 8-yard pass from John Dutton (Matt Denny kick), Tied 28–28

3rd quarter

- Cleveland – (13:46) Robert Redd 18-yard pass from John Dutton (Matt Denny kick blocked), Cleveland 34–28
- Cleveland – (6:14) Troy Bergeron 33-yard pass from John Dutton (Matt Denny kick), Cleveland 41–28
- Spokane – (3:57) Greg Orton 10-yard pass from Kyle Rowley (Taylor Rownan kick failed), Cleveland 41–34

4th quarter

- Cleveland – (13:56) John Dutton 1-yard run (Matt Denny kick), Cleveland 48–34
- Cleveland – (6:35) Carlos Downey 5-yard run, Cleveland 54–34
- Spokane – (4:45) Markee White 2-yard pass from Kyle Rowley (Taylor Rownan kick), Cleveland 54–41
- Spokane – (2:13) Markee White 19-yard pass from Kyle Rowley (Taylor Rownan kick), Cleveland 54–48
- Cleveland – (0:57) Troy Bergeron 12-yard pass from Kurt Rocco (Matt Denny kick), Cleveland 61–48
- Spokane – (0:46) Emery Sammons 13-yard pass from Kyle Rowley (Taylor Rownan kick), Cleveland 61–55

Passing

- Cleveland – John Dutton: 20/30, 257, 6 TD
- Spokane – Kyle Rowley: 29/45, 313 yards, 7 TD, 1 INT

Rushing

- Cleveland – Troy Bergeron: 2 att, 10 yards
- Spokane – Emery Sammons: 1 att, 4 yards

Receiving

- Cleveland – Troy Bergeron: 8 rec, 134 yards, 4 TD
- Spokane – Markee White: 10 rec, 103 yards, 3 TD

=== Week 3: at Iowa Barnstormers ===
Week 3: Spokane Shock at Iowa Barnstormers – Game summary

Quarter	1	2	3	4	Total
Shock	14	14	7	7	42
Barnstormers	12	6	19	6	43

at Wells Fargo Arena, Des Moines, Iowa

- Date: March 25
- Game time: 5:00 p.m. PDT
- Game attendance: 10,552
- Referee: Joe Pester
- Recap

Game information

1st quarter

- Iowa – (11:12) Jesse Schmidt 15-yard pass from Brad Banks (Piotr Czech kick failed), Iowa 6–0
- Spokane – (8:17) Greg Orton 6-yard pass from Kyle Rowley (Taylor Rownan kick), Spokane 7–6
- Iowa – (4:13) Brad Banks 22-yard run (Piotr Czech kick failed), Iowa 12–7
- Spokane – (2:22) Greg Orton 12-yard pass from Kyle Rowley (Taylor Rownan kick), Spokane 14–12

2nd quarter

- Spokane – (8:01) Greg Orton 28-yard pass from Kyle Rowley (Taylor Rownan kick), Spokane 21–12
- Spokane – (5:39) Shaun Kauleinamoku 8-yard pass from Kyle Rowley (Taylor Rownan kick), Spokane 28–12
- Iowa – (1:32) Brad Banks 1-yard run (Piotr Czech kick failed), Spokane 28–18

3rd quarter

- Iowa – (7:57) Todd Blythe 16-yard pass from Brad Banks (Piotr Czech kick), Spokane 28–25
- Iowa – (5:18) Todd Blythe 21-yard pass from Brad Banks (Piotr Czech kick failed), Iowa 31–28
- Iowa – (3:38) Jesse Schmidt 11-yard pass from Brad Banks (Piotr Czech kick failed), Iowa 37–28
- Spokane – (2:25) Greg Orton 38-yard pass from Kyle Rowley (Taylor Rownan kick), Iowa 37–35

4th quarter

- Iowa – (14:20) Todd Blythe 4-yard pass from Brad Banks (Piotr Czech kick failed), Iowa 43–35
- Spokane – (13:03) Greg Orton 47-yard pass from Kyle Rowley (Taylor Rownan kick), Iowa 43–42

Passing

- Spokane – Kyle Rowley: 22/33, 302 yards, 6 TD, 3 INT
- Iowa – Brad Banks: 20/32, 244 yards, 5 TD, 1 INT

Rushing

- Spokane – Kyle Rowley: 1 att, 0 yards
- Iowa – Brad Banks: 10 att, 44 yards, 2 TD

Receiving

- Spokane – Greg Orton: 9 rec, 203 yards, 5 TD
- Iowa – Jesse Schmidt: 11 rec, 157 yards, 2 TD

=== Week 4: vs. Kansas City Command ===
Week 4: Kansas City Command at Spokane Shock – Game summary

Quarter	1	2	3	4	Total
Command	6	6	7	15	34
Shock	17	21	10	13	61

at Spokane Veterans Memorial Arena, Spokane, Washington

- Date: April 1
- Game time: 8:00 p.m. PDT
- Game attendance: 9,172
- Referee: Shawn Hochuli
- Recap

Game information

1st quarter

- Spokane – (14:34) Shaun Kauleinamoku 30-yard pass from Kyle Rowley (Raul Vijil kick), Spokane 7–0
- Kansas City – (11:11) Bradley Chavez 7-yard pass from J.J. Raterink (Brian Umstead kick failed), Spokane 7–6
- Spokane – (7:22) Raul Vijil 4-yard pass from Kyle Rowley (Taylor Rowan kick), Spokane 14–6
- Spokane – Taylor Rowan 27-yard field goal, Spokane 17–6

2nd quarter

- Kansas City – (13:58) J.J. Raterink 3-yard run (Brian Umstead kick blocked), Spokane 17–12
- Spokane – (10:47) Emery Sammons 25-yard pass from Kyle Rowley (Taylor Rowan kick), Spokane 24–12
- Spokane – (5:58) Greg Orton 18-yard pass from Kyle Rowley (Taylor Rowan kick), Spokane 31–12
- Spokane – (0:12) Raul Vijil 11-yard pass from Kyle Rowley (Taylor Rowan kick), Spokane 38–12

3rd quarter

- Kansas City – (13:13) J.J. Raterink 1-yard run (Brian Umstead kick), Spokane 38–19
- Spokane – (10:24) Shaun Kauleinamoku 20-yard pass from Kyle Rowley (Taylor Rowan kick), Spokane 45–19
- Spokane – (5:30) Taylor Rowan 19-yard field goal, Spokane 48–19

4th quarter

- Spokane – (14:55) Emery Sammons 24-yard pass from Kyle Rowley (Taylor Rowan kick failed), Spokane 54–19
- Kansas City – (9:21) J.J. Raterink 2-yard run (Brian Umstead kick), Spokane 54–26
- Spokane – (6:26) Emery Sammons 2-yard run (Taylor Rowan kick), Spokane 61–26
- Kansas City – (3:01) Steven Savoy 19-yard pass from J.J. Raterink (Steven Savoy rush), Spokane 61–34

Passing

- Kansas City – J.J. Raterink: 26/44, 306 yards, 2 TD, 1 INT
- Spokane – Kyle Rowley: 19/30, 219 yards, 7 TD

Rushing

- Kansas City – J.J. Raterink: 6 att, 17 yards, 3 TD
- Spokane – Clay Harrell: 2 att, 7 yards

Receiving

- Kansas City – Steven Savoy: 8 rec, 131 yards, 1 TD
- Spokane – Shaun Kauleinamoku: 5 rec, 77 yards, 2 TD

=== Week 6: at Utah Blaze ===
Week 6: Spokane Shock at Utah Blaze – Game summary

Quarter	1	2	3	4	Total
Shock	7	14	14	27	62
Blaze	13	21	14	21	69

at EnergySolutions Arena, Salt Lake City, Utah

- Date: April 15
- Game time: 2:00 p.m. PDT
- Game attendance: 7,649
- Referee: Shawn Anderson
- Recap

Game information

1st quarter

- Utah – (10:48) Aaron Boone 8-yard pass from Tommy Grady (Greg Gunderson kick failed), Utah 6–0
- Spokane – (6:12) Shaun Kauleinamoku 7-yard pass from Kyle Rowley (Taylor Rowan kick), Spokane 7–6
- Utah – (2:03) Ben Stallings 2-yard run (Greg Gunderson kick), Utah 13–7

2nd quarter

- Utah – (13:10) Aaron Lesue 10-yard pass from Tommy Grady (Greg Gunderson kick), Utah 20–7
- Spokane – (10:41) Greg Orton 16-yard pass from Kyle Rowley (Taylor Rowan kick), Utah 20–14
- Utah – (7:42) Aaron Boone 5-yard pass from Tommy Grady (Greg Gunderson kick), Utah 27–14
- Utah – (1:08) Ben Stallings 10-yard run (Greg Gunderson kick), Utah 34–14
- Spokane – (0:04) Greg Orton 1-yard pass from Kyle Rowley (Taylor Rowan kick), Utah 34–21

3rd quarter

- Spokane – (10:55) Emery Sammons 6-yard pass from Kyle Rowley (Taylor Rowan kick), Utah 34–28
- Utah – (7:20) Aaron Lesue 9-yard pass from Tommy Grady (Greg Gunderson kick), Utah 41–28
- Spokane – (5:35) Greg Orton 26-yard pass from Kyle Rowley (Taylor Rowan kick), Utah 41–35
- Utah – (0:38) Aaron Lesue 3-yard pass from Tommy Grady (Greg Gunderson kick), Utah 48–35

4th quarter

- Spokane – (11:59) Greg Orton 4-yard pass from Kyle Rowley (Taylor Rowan kick), Utah 48–42
- Utah – (10:07) Ben Stallings 21-yard run (Greg Gunderson kick), Utah 55–42
- Spokane – (5:06) Greg Orton 12-yard pass from Kyle Rowley (Taylor Rowan kick), Utah 55–49
- Utah – (4:28) Ernest Pierce 7-yard kickoff return (Greg Gunderson kick), Utah 62–49
- Spokane – (1:27) Shaun Kauleinamoku 2-yard pass from Kyle Rowley (Taylor Rowan kick failed), Utah 62–55
- Utah – (0:49) Aaron Boone 9-yard pass from Tommy Grady (Greg Gunderson kick), Utah 69–55
- Spokane – (0:19) Shaun Kauleinamoku 2-yard pass from Kyle Rowley (Taylor Rowan kick), Utah 69–62

Passing

- Spokane – Kyle Rowley: 35/43, 323 yards, 9 TD
- Utah – Tommy Grady: 26/33, 245 yards, 6 TD

Rushing

- Spokane – Clay Harrell: 1 att, 13 yards
- Utah – Ben Stallings: 5 att, 33 yards, 3 TD

Receiving

- Spokane – Greg Orton: 14 rec, 146 yards, 5 TD
- Utah – Aaron Boone: 10 rec, 100 yards, 3 TD

=== Week 7: at Orlando Predators ===
Week 7: Spokane Shock at Orlando Predators – Game summary

Quarter	1	2	3	4	Total
Shock	21	14	14	21	70
Predators	7	21	10	20	58

at Amway Center, Orlando, Florida

- Date: April 23
- Game time: 4:30 p.m. PDT
- Game attendance: 11,756
- Referee: Shawn Anderson
- Recap

Game information

1st quarter

- Spokane – (12:22) Shaun Kauleinamoku 13-yard pass from Kyle Rowley (Taylor Rowan kick), Spokane 7–0
- Spokane – (6:20) Shaun Kauleinamoku 22-yard pass from Kyle Rowley (Taylor Rowan kick), Spokane 14–0
- Orlando – (4:22) Josh Bush 37-yard pass from Nick Hill (Mark Lewis kick), Spokane 14–7
- Spokane – (0:16) Raul Vijil 9-yard pass from Kyle Rowley (Taylor Rowan kick), Spokane 21–7

2nd quarter

- Orlando – (10:52) Kenny McEntyre 11-yard interception return (Mark Lewis kick), Spokane 21–14
- Orlando – (4:19) Josh Bush 1-yard pass from Nick Hill (Mark Lewis kick), Tied 21–21
- Spokane – (2:07) Raul Vijil 3-yard pass from Kyle Rowley (Taylor Rowan kick), Spokane 28–21
- Orlando – (0:23) Nick Hill 3-yard run (Mark Lewis kick), Tied 28–28
- Spokane – (0:13) Raul Vijil 41-yard pass from Kyle Rowley (Taylor Rowan kick), Spokane 35–28

3rd quarter

- Orlando – (12:24) Mark Lewis 31-yard field goal, Spokane 35–31
- Spokane – (9:28) Raul Vijil 8-yard pass from Kyle Rowley (Taylor Rowan kick), Spokane 42–31
- Orlando – (4:32) Josh Bush 24-yard pass from Nick Hill (Mark Lewis kick), Spokane 42–38
- Spokane – (0:00) Shaun Kauleinamoku 17-yard pass from Kyle Rowley (Taylor Rowan kick), Spokane 49–38

4th quarter

- Spokane – (11:14) Kyle Rowley 1-yard run (Taylor Rowan kick), Spokane 56–38
- Orlando – (7:36) Nick Hill 30-yard run (Mark Lewis kick), Spokane 56–45
- Spokane – (5:32) Raul Vijil 1-yard pass from Kyle Rowley (Taylor Rowan kick), Spokane 63–45
- Orlando – (1:18) James Lynch 1-yard run (Mark Lewis kick), Spokane 63–52
- Spokane – (0:44) Kyle Rowley 1-yard run (Taylor Rowan kick), Spokane 70–52
- Orlando – (0:07) Doug Gabriel 8-yard pass from Nick Hill (Nick Hill pass failed), Spokane 70–52

Passing

- Spokane – Kyle Rowley: 23/32, 293 yards, 8 TD, 1 INT
- Orlando – Nick Hill: 23/41, 299 yards, 4 TD

Rushing

- Spokane – Kyle Rowley: 4 att, 5 yards, 2 TD
- Orlando – Nick Hill: 6 att, 57 yards, 2 TD

Receiving

- Spokane – Raul Vijil: 7 rec, 88 yards, 5 TD
- Orlando – Josh Bush: 11 rec, 162 yards, 3 TD

=== Week 8: vs. Arizona Rattlers ===
Week 8: Arizona Rattlers at Spokane Shock – Game summary

Quarter	1	2	3	4	Total
Rattlers	7	21	14	27	69
Shock	7	21	21	21	70

at Spokane Veterans Memorial Arena, Spokane, Washington

- Date: April 30
- Game time: 7:00 p.m. PDT
- Game attendance: 10,113
- Referee: Dave Cutaia
- Recap

Game information

1st quarter

- Spokane – (11:12) Kyle Rowley 1-yard run (Taylor Rowan kick), Spokane 7–0
- Arizona – (5:10) Jason Geathers 8-yard pass from Nick Davila (Fabrizio Scaccia kick), Tied 7–7

2nd quarter

- Arizona – (13:15) Odie Armstrong 1-yard run (Fabrizio Scaccia kick), Arizona 14–7
- Spokane – (7:16) Greg Orton 4-yard pass from Kyle Rowley (Taylor Rowan kick), Tied 14–14
- Arizona – (0:55) Odie Armstrong 8-yard run (Fabrizio Scaccia kick), Arizona 21–14
- Spokane – (0:47) Raul Vijil 4-yard pass from Kyle Rowley (Taylor Rowan kick), Tied 21–21
- Arizona – (0:37) Trandon Harvey 13-yard pass from Nick Davila (Fabrizio Scaccia kick), Arizona 28–21
- Spokane – (0:05) Raul Vijil 25-yard pass from Kyle Rowley (Taylor Rowan kick), Tied 28–28

3rd quarter

- Spokane – (13:35) Greg Orton 3-yard pass from Kyle Rowley (Taylor Rowan kick), Spokane 35–28
- Arizona – (9:52) Jason Geathers 20-yard pass from Nick Davila (Fabrizio Scaccia kick), Tied 35–35
- Spokane – (7:21) Shaun Kauleinamoku 24-yard pass from Kyle Rowley (Taylor Rowan kick), Spokane 42–35
- Arizona – (5:38) John Booker 6-yard pass from Nick Davila (Fabrizio Scaccia kick), Tied 42–42
- Spokane – (2:35) Raul Vijil 6-yard pass from Kyle Rowley (Taylor Rowan kick), Spokane 49–42

4th quarter

- Spokane – (14:55) Raul Vijil 4-yard pass from Kyle Rowley (Taylor Rowan kick), Spokane 56–42
- Arizona – (13:33) Trandon Harvey 24-yard pass from Nick Davila (Fabrizio Scaccia kick), Spokane 56–49
- Spokane – (9:28) Greg Orton 11-yard pass from Kyle Rowley (Taylor Rowan kick), Spokane 63–49
- Arizona – (3:32) Odie Armstrong 3-yard run (Fabrizio Scaccia kick), Spokane 63–56
- Spokane – (3:03) Raul Vijil 8-yard kickoff return (Taylor Rowan kick), Spokane 70–56
- Arizona – (0:52) Rod Windsor 4-yard pass from Nick Davila (Fabrizio Scaccia kick), Spokane 70–63
- Arizona – (0:11) Odie Armstrong 4-yard run (Nick Davila pass failed), Spokane 70–69

Passing

- Arizona – Nick Davila: 29/43, 318 yards, 6 TD
- Spokane – Kyle Rowley: 21/31, 219 yards, 8 TD, 1 INT

Rushing

- Arizona – Odie Armstrong: 9 att, 40 yards, 4 TD
- Spokane – Clay Harrell: 2 att, 9 yards

Receiving

- Arizona – Rod Windsor: 16 rec, 167 yards, 1 TD
- Spokane – Raul Vijil: 5 rec, 57 yards, 4 TD

=== Week 9: at Pittsburgh Power ===
Week 9: Spokane Shock at Pittsburgh Power – Game summary

Quarter	1	2	3	4	Total
Shock	13	14	7	7	41
Power	14	0	20	17	51

at Consol Energy Center, Pittsburgh, Pennsylvania

- Date: May 7
- Game time: 5:00 p.m. PDT
- Game attendance: 6,756
- Referee: Perry Havener
- Recap

Game information

1st quarter

- Spokane – (14:46) Terrance Sanders 57-yard kickoff return (Taylor Rowan kick failed), Spokane 6–0
- Pittsburgh – (12:24) Bernard Morris 31-yard run (Paul Edinger kick), Pittsburgh 7–6
- Spokane – (8:52) Raul Vijil 8-yard pass from Kyle Rowley (Taylor Rowan kick), Spokane 13–7
- Pittsburgh – (2:53) Jason Willis 5-yard pass from Bernard Morris (Paul Edinger kick), Pittsburgh 14–13

2nd quarter

- Spokane – (7:40) Greg Orton 1-yard pass from Kyle Rowley (Taylor Rowan kick), Spokane 20–14
- Spokane – (0:10) Shaun Kauleinamoku 11-yard pass from Kyle Rowley (Taylor Rowan kick), Spokane 27–14

3rd quarter

- Pittsburgh – (13:55) Bernard Morris 5-yard run (Paul Edinger kick), Spokane 27–21
- Spokane – (9:29) Raul Vijil 10-yard pass from Kyle Rowley (Taylor Rowan kick), Spokane 34–21
- Pittsburgh – (8:06) Michael Washington 31-yard pass from Bernard Morris (Paul Edinger kick blocked), Spokane 34–27
- Pittsburgh – (1:33) Michael Washington 34-yard pass from Bernard Morris (Paul Edinger kick), Tied 34–34

4th quarter

- Pittsburgh – (8:48) D.J. Hall 7-yard pass from Bernard Morris (Paul Edinger kick), Pittsburgh 41–34
- Spokane – (4:26) Clay Harrell 1-yard run (Taylor Rowan kick), Tied 41–41
- Pittsburgh – (0:50) Jason Willis 6-yard pass from Bernard Morris (Paul Edinger kick), Pittsburgh 48–41
- Pittsburgh – (0:17) Paul Edinger 45-yard field goal, Pittsburgh 51–41

Passing

- Spokane – Kyle Rowley: 19/44, 244 yards, 4 TD, 2 INT
- Pittsburgh – Bernard Morris: 18/33, 226 yards, 5 TD, 1 INT

Rushing

- Spokane – Clay Harrell: 3 att, 13 yards, 1 TD
- Pittsburgh – Bernard Morris: 8 att, 66 yards, 2 TD

Receiving

- Spokane – Raul Vijil: 5 rec, 61 yards, 2 TD
- Pittsburgh – Jason Willis: 7 rec, 87 yards, 2 TD

=== Week 10: vs. Dallas Vigilantes ===
Week 10: Dallas Vigilantes at Spokane Shock – Game summary

Quarter	1	2	3	4	Total
Vigilantes	20	6	7	16	49
Shock	13	28	16	14	71

at Spokane Veterans Memorial Arena, Spokane, Washington

- Date: May 14
- Game time: 7:00 p.m. PDT
- Game attendance: 9,368
- Referee: Shane Anderson
- Recap

Game information

1st quarter

- Dallas – (12:27) Anthony Jones 23-yard pass from Dan Raudabaugh (Cory Long kick), Dallas 7–0
- Spokane – (10:13) Raul Vijil 8-yard pass from Bill Stull (Taylor Rowan kick blocked), Dallas 7–6
- Dallas – (4:49) Matt Fields 5-yard pass from Dan Raudabaugh (Cory Long kick), Dallas 14–6
- Spokane – (2:00) Bill Stull 11-yard run (Taylor Rowan kick), Dallas 14–13
- Dallas – (0:59) Derrick Ross 3-yard run (Cory Long kick failed), Dallas 20–13

2nd quarter

- Spokane – (12:55) Clay Harrell 8-yard run (Taylor Rowan kick), Tied 20–20
- Spokane – (11:35) Lance Witherspoon 5-yard fumble recovery (Taylor Rowan kick), Spokane 27–20
- Dallas – (6:03) Anthony Jones 10-yard pass from Dan Raudabaugh (Cory Long kick blocked) Spokane 27–26
- Spokane – (2:15) Raul Vijil 4-yard pass from Kyle Rowley (Taylor Rowan kick), Spokane 34–26
- Spokane – (0:05) Raul Vijil 4-yard pass from Kyle Rowley (Taylor Rowan kick), Spokane 41–26

3rd quarter

- Spokane – (9:45) Greg Orton 5-yard pass from Kyle Rowley (Taylor Rowan kick), Spokane 48–26
- Spokane – (7:48) Khreem Smith safety, Spokane 50–26
- Spokane – (6:46) Greg Orton 23-yard pass from Kyle Rowley (Taylor Rowan kick), Spokane 57–26
- Dallas – (2:11) DeAndrew Rubin 16-yard pass from Dan Raudabaugh (Cory Long kick), Spokane 57–33

4th quarter

- Spokane – (11:25) Greg Orton 6-yard pass from Kyle Rowley (Taylor Rowan kick), Spokane 64–33
- Dallas – (8:48) DeAndrew Rubin 35-yard pass from Luke Drone (Luke Drone pass failed), Spokane 64–39
- Spokane – (7:50) Antwan Marsh 4-yard kickoff return (Taylor Rowan kick), Spokane 71–39
- Dallas – (6:54) DeAndrew Rubin 30-yard pass from Luke Drone (Luke Drone pass), Spokane 71–47
- Dallas – (4:58) Kelvin Kinney safety, Spokane 71–49

Passing

- Dallas – Dan Raudabaugh: 15/21, 162 yards, 4 TD
- Spokane – Kyle Rowley: 18/28, 169 yards, 5 TD

Rushing

- Dallas – Derrick Ross: 7 att, 18 yards, 1 TD
- Spokane – Bill Stull: 1 att, 11 yards, 1 TD

Receiving

- Dallas – DeAndrew Rubin: 9 rec, 134 yards, 3 TD
- Spokane – Greg Orton: 7 rec, 86 yards, 3 TD

=== Week 11: vs. Tampa Bay Storm ===
Week 11: Tampa Bay Storm at Spokane Shock – Game summary

Quarter	1	2	3	4	Total
Storm	7	24	0	20	51
Shock	13	9	0	20	42

at Spokane Veterans Memorial Arena, Spokane, Washington

- Date: May 20
- Game time: 8:00 p.m. PDT
- Game attendance: 9,320
- Referee: Dave Cutaia
- Recap

Game information

1st quarter

- Tampa Bay – (13:26) Amari Jackson 6-yard pass from Brian Zbydniewski (Kyle Chilton kick), Tampa Bay 7–0
- Spokane – (12:30) Ruschard Dodd-Masters 55-yard kickoff return (Taylor Rowan kick blocked), Tampa Bay 7–6
- Spokane – (5:35) Raul Vijil 2-yard pass from Casey Hansen (Taylor Rowan kick), Spokane 13–7

2nd quarter

- Tampa Bay – (12:52) Kyle Chilton 17-yard field goal, Spokane 13–10
- Spokane – (11:22) Greg Orton 27-yard pass from Casey Hansen (Taylor Rowan kick failed), Spokane 20–10
- Tampa Bay – (7:17) Huey Whittaker 20-yard pass from Brian Zbydniewski (Kyle Chilton kick), Spokane 19–17
- Tampa Bay – (3:05) Amari Jackson 11-yard pass from Brian Zbydniewski (Kyle Chilton kick), Tampa Bay 24–19
- Tampa Bay – (0:39) Huey Whittaker 24v pass from Brian Zbydniewski (Kyle Chilton kick), Tampa Bay 31–19
- Spokane – (0:00) Taylor Rowan 44-yard field goal, Tampa Bay 31–22

3rd quarter

No scoring

4th quarter

- Spokane – (9:48) Emery Sammons 1-yard run (Taylor Rowan kick blocked), Tampa Bay 31–28
- Tampa Bay – (5:57) Huey Whittaker 12-yard pass from Brian Zbydniewski (Kyle Chilton kick), Tampa Bay 38–28
- Spokane – (3:08) Raul Vijil 4-yard pass from Casey Hansen (Taylor Rowan kick blocked), Tampa Bay 38–34
- Tampa Bay – (1:09) Amari Jackson 10-yard pass from Brian Zbydniewski (Kyle Chilton kick failed), Tampa Bay 44–34
- Tampa Bay – (0:45) Michael Hawthorne 17-yard interception return (Kyle Chilton kick), Tampa Bay 51–34
- Spokane – (0:21) Greg Orton 16-yard pass from Casey Hansen (Casey Hansen pass), Tampa Bay 51–42

Passing

- Tampa Bay – Brian Zbydniewski: 23/33, 233 yards, 6 TD, 1 INT
- Spokane – Casey Hansen: 25/43, 288 yards, 4 TD, 1 INT

Rushing

- Tampa Bay – Terrence Royal: 8 att, 15 yards
- Spokane – Emery Sammons: 1 att, 1 yard, 1 TD

Receiving

- Tampa Bay – Huey Whittaker: 11 rec, 123 yards, 3 TD
- Spokane – Raul Vijil: 14 rec, 146 yards, 2 TD

=== Week 12: at Kansas City Command ===
Week 12: Spokane Shock at Kansas City Command – Game summary

Quarter	1	2	3	4	Total
Shock	7	7	13	15	42
Command	13	16	13	3	45

at Sprint Center, Kansas City, Missouri

- Date: May 28
- Game time: 5:00 p.m. PDT
- Game attendance: 3,870
- Referee: Larry Smith
- Recap

Game information

- Spokane – (13:44) Alex Teems 19-yard fumble recovery (Taylor Rowan kick), Spokane 7–0
- Kansas City – (12:44) Carlton Brown 56-yard kickoff return (Brian Umstead kick), Tied 7–7
- Kansas City – (2:28) Bradly Chavez 1-yard run (Brian Umstead kick blocked), Kansas City 13–7

2nd quarter

- Kansas City – (8:35) Brian Umstead 17-yard field goal, Kansas City 16–7
- Spokane – (2:16) Emery Sammons 6-yard pass from Casey Hansen (Taylor Rowan kick), Kansas City 16–14
- Kansas City – (0:35) Robert Gill 13-yard pass from J.J. Raterink (Brian Umstead kick failed), Kansas City 22–14
- Kansas City – (0:00) Bradly Chavez 0-yard blocked field goal return (Brian Umstead kick), Kansas City 29–14

3rd quarter

- Spokane – (14:11) Raul Vijil 24-yard pass from Casey Hansen (Taylor Rowan kick blocked), Kansas City 29–20
- Kansas City – (6:34) Bret Smith 1-yard pass from J.J. Raterink (Brian Umstead kick), Kansas City 36–20
- Spokane – (5:46) Terrance Sanders 54-yard kickoff return (Taylor Rowan kick), Kansas City 36–27
- Kansas City – (1:43) Robert Gill 6-yard pass from J.J. Raterink (Brian Umstead kick failed), Kansas City 42–27

4th quarter

- Spokane – (13:43) Greg Orton 2-yard pass from Casey Hansen (Taylor Rowan kick), Kansas City 42–34
- Spokane – (4:51) Emery Sammons 3-yard pass from Casey Hansen (Casey Hansen pass), Tied 42–42
- Kansas City – (0:00) Brian Umstead 23-yard field goal, Kansas City 45–42

Passing

- Spokane – Casey Hansen: 17/35, 159 yards, 4 TD
- Kansas City – J.J. Raterink: 23/27, 207 yards, 3 TD

Rushing

- Spokane – Casey Hansen: 2 att, 0 yards
- Kansas City – J.J. Raterink: 7 att, 10 yards

Receiving

- Spokane – Raul Vijil: 4 rec, 59 yards, 1 TD
- Kansas City – Robert Gill: 6 rec, 63 yards, 2 TD

=== Week 14: vs. Philadelphia Soul ===
Week 14: Philadelphia Soul at Spokane Shock – Game summary

Quarter	1	2	3	4	Total
Soul	7	21	6	20	54
Shock	27	7	14	27	75

at Spokane Veterans Memorial Arena, Spokane, Washington

- Date: June 10
- Game time: 5:00 p.m. PDT
- Game attendance: 8,972
- Referee: Shawn Hochuli
- Recap

Game information

1st quarter

- Spokane – (11:50) Markee White 1-yard pass from Erik Meyer (Taylor Rowan kick), Spokane 7–0
- Spokane – (10:24) Greg Orton 39-yard pass from Erik Meyer (Taylor Rowan kick), Spokane 14–0
- Spokane – (8:45) Markee White 15-yard pass from Erik Meyer (Taylor Rowan kick failed), Spokane 20–0
- Philadelphia – (7:28) Donovan Morgan 45-yard pass from Ryan Vena (Robbie Smith kick), Spokane 20–7
- Spokane – (5:11) Adron Tennell 26-yard pass from Erik Meyer (Taylor Rowan kick), Spokane 27–7

2nd quarter

- Philadelphia – (11:54) Donovan Morgan 13-yard pass from Ryan Vena (Robbie Smith kick), Spokane 27–14
- Spokane – (4:17) Ben Ossai 5-yard pass from Erik Meyer (Taylor Rowan kick), Spokane 34–14
- Philadelphia – (3:23) Keith Stokes 56-yard kickoff return (Robbie Smith kick), Spokane 34–21
- Philadelphia – (0:55) Donovan Morgan 5-yard pass from Ryan Vena (Robbie Smith kick), Spokane 34–28

3rd quarter

- Philadelphia – (12:49) Larry Brackins 15-yard pass from Ryan Vena (Robbie Smith kick failed), Tied 34–34
- Spokane – (6:42) Antwan Marsh 3-yard run (Taylor Rowan kick), Spokane 41–34
- Spokane – (0:00) Beau Bell 19-yard interception return (Taylor Rowan kick), Spokane 48–34

4th quarter

- Spokane – (14:43) Ruschard Dodd-Masters 14-yard interception return (ROWAN, Taylor kick), Spokane 55–34
- Philadelphia – (13:02) Syvelle Newton 28-yard pass from Ryan Vena (Robbie Smith kick failed), Spokane 55–40
- Spokane – (12:00) Markee White 9-yard pass from Erik Meyer (Taylor Rowan kick failed), Spokane 61–40
- Philadelphia – (9:42) Ryan Vena 2-yard run (Robbie Smith kick), Spokane 61–47
- Spokane – (4:05) Antwan Marsh 2-yard run (Taylor Rowan kick), Spokane 68–47
- Philadelphia – (0:44) Ryan Vena 2-yard run (Robbie Smith kick), Spokane 68–54
- Spokane – (0:24) Greg Orton 28-yard pass from Erik Meyer (Taylor Rowan kick), Spokane 75–54

Passing

- Philadelphia – Ryan Vena: 23/41, 300 yards, 5 TD, 3 INT
- Spokane – Erik Meyer: 26/36, 332 yards, 7 TD, 1 INT

Rushing

- Philadelphia – Ryan Vena: 3 att, 8 yards, 2 TD
- Spokane – Antwan Marsh: 2 att, 5 yards, 2 TD

Receiving

- Philadelphia – Syvelle Newton: 10 rec, 131 yards, 1 TD
- Spokane – Greg Orton: 10 rec, 151 yards, 2 TD

=== Week 15: vs. Chicago Rush ===
Week 15: Chicago Rush at Spokane Shock – Game summary

Quarter	1	2	3	4	Total
Rush	14	13	12	21	60
Shock	14	28	14	7	63

at Spokane Veterans Memorial Arena, Spokane, Washington

- Date: June 18
- Game time: 7:00 p.m. PDT
- Game attendance: 9,499
- Referee: Dave Cutaia
- Recap

Game information

1st quarter

- Chicago – (12:24) Reggie Gray 17-yard pass from Russ Michna (Rob Forstrom kick), Chicago 7–0
- Spokane – (9:28) Emery Sammons 6-yard pass from Erik Meyer (Taylor Rowan kick), Tied 7–7
- Chicago – (6:39) Reggie Gray 6-yard pass from Russ Michna (Rob Forstrom kick), Chicago 14–7
- Spokane – (3:05) Greg Orton 5-yard pass from Erik Meyer (Taylor Rowan kick), Tied 14–14

2nd quarter

- Chicago – (13:30) Reggie Gray 29-yard pass from Russ Michna (Rob Forstrom kick failed), Chicago 20–14
- Spokane – (9:06) Markee White 15-yard pass from Erik Meyer (Taylor Rowan kick), Spokane 21–20
- Chicago – (6:49) Reggie Gray 8-yard pass from Russ Michna (Rob Forstrom kick), Chicago 27–21
- Spokane – (4:45) Shaun Kauleinamoku 29-yard pass from Erik Meyer (Taylor Rowan kick), Spokane 28–27
- Spokane – (0:26) Antwan Marsh 1-yard run (Taylor Rowan kick), Spokane 35–27
- Spokane – (0:20) Jonathan Williams 0-yard fumble recovery (Taylor Rowan kick), Spokane 42–27

3rd quarter

- Spokane – (13:41) Greg Orton 37-yard pass from Erik Meyer (Taylor Rowan kick), Spokane 49–27
- Chicago – (8:40) Charles Dillon 11-yard pass from Dominic Randolph (Rob Forstrom kick failed), Spokane 49–33
- Chicago – (2:35) Charles Dillon 4-yard pass from Dominic Randolph (Dominic Randolph pass failed), Spokane 49–39
- Spokane – (0:50) Greg Orton 43-yard pass from Steven Sheffield (Taylor Rowan kick), Spokane 56–39

4th quarter

- Chicago – (14:08) Charles Dillon 31-yard pass from Dominic Randolph (Rob Forstrom kick failed), Spokane 56–45
- Spokane – (11:10) Shaun Kauleinamoku 32-yard pass from Steven Sheffield (Taylor Rowan kick), Spokane 63–45
- Chicago – (5:22) Reggie Gray 7-yard pass from Dominic Randolph (Rob Forstrom kick), Spokane 63–52
- Chicago – (0:52) Dominic Randolph 7-yard run (Dominic Randolph pass), Spokane 63–60

Passing

- Chicago – Russ Michna: 13/18, 161 yards, 4 TD, 1 INT
- Spokane – Erik Meyer: 15/19, 202 yards, 5 TD, 1 INT

Rushing

- Chicago – Johnie Kirton: 5 att, 27 yards
- Spokane – Clay Harrell: 4 att, 16 yards

Receiving

- Chicago – Reggie Gray: 9 rec, 125 yards, 4 TD
- Spokane – Greg Orton: 10 rec, 169 yards, 3 TD

=== Week 16: at New Orleans VooDoo ===
Week 16: Spokane Shock at New Orleans VooDoo – Game summary

Quarter	1	2	3	4	Total
Shock	21	20	14	20	75
VooDoo	7	7	7	33	54

at New Orleans Arena, New Orleans, Louisiana

- Date: June 25
- Game time: 5:00 p.m. PDT
- Game attendance: 9,037
- Referee: Scott Vaughn
- Recap

Game information

1st quarter

- Spokane – (14:47) Terrance Sanders 57-yard kickoff return (Taylor Rowan kick), Spokane 7–0
- New Orleans – (10:05) Carlese Franklin 19-yard pass from D. Bryant (Jonathan Ruffin kick), Tied 7–7
- Spokane – (6:52) Shaun Kauleinamoku 11-yard pass from Kyle Rowley (Taylor Rowan kick), Spokane 14–7
- Spokane – (4:46) Antwan Marsh 12-yard fumble recovery (Taylor Rowan kick), Spokane 21–7

2nd quarter

- Spokane – (14:54) Kyle Rowley 1-yard run (Taylor Rowan kick blocked), Spokane 27–7
- New Orleans – (13:53) P.J. Berry 54-yard kickoff return (Jonathan Ruffin kick), Spokane 27–14
- Spokane – (8:20) Chas Gessner 20-yard pass from Kyle Rowley (Taylor Rowan kick), Spokane 34–14
- Spokane – (0:06) Chas Gessner 34-yard pass from Kyle Rowley (Taylor Rowan kick), Spokane 41–14

3rd quarter

- Spokane – (7:18) Greg Orton 28-yard pass from Kyle Rowley (Taylor Rowan kick), Spokane 48–14
- New Orleans – (5:52) Skyler Green 7-yard pass from D. Bryant (Jonathan Ruffin kick), Spokane 48–21
- Spokane – (0:15) Clay Harrell 1-yard run (Taylor Rowan kick), Spokane 55–21

4th quarter

- New Orleans – (11:00) P.J. Berry 16-yard pass from D. Bryant (Jonathan Ruffin kick), Spokane 55–28
- New Orleans – (10:07) P.J. Berry 30-yard pass from D. Bryant (Jonathan Ruffin failed), Spokane 55–34
- Spokane – (7:41) Shaun Kauleinamoku 8-yard pass from Bill Stull (Taylor Rowan kick), Spokane 62–34
- New Orleans – (6:04) Skyler Green 21-yard pass from D. Bryant (D. Bryant pass intercepted), Spokane 62–40
- Spokane – (2:41) Adron Tennell 21-yard pass from Bill Stull (Taylor Rowan kick), Spokane 69–40
- New Orleans – (1:03) P.J. Berry 11-yard pass from D. Bryant (D. Bryant pass), Spokane 69–48
- Spokane – (0:34) Bill Stull 1-yard run (Taylor Rowan kick failed), Spokane 75–48
- New Orleans – (0:07) Tom Taggert 2-yard run (D. Bryant pass failed), Spokane 75–54

Passing

- Spokane – Kyle Rowley: 16/27, 123 yards, 4 TD
- New Orleans – D. Bryant: 24/41, 271 yards, 6 TD

Rushing

- Spokane – Clay Harrell and Bill Stull: 1 att, 1 yard, 1 TD
- New Orleans – Tom Taggert: 2 att, 6 yards, 1 TD

Receiving

- Spokane – Chas Gessner: 7 rec, 96 yards, 2 TD
- New Orleans – P.J. Berry: 7 rec, 95 yards, 3 TD

=== Week 17: at Arizona Rattlers ===
Week 17: Spokane Shock at Arizona Rattlers – Game summary

Quarter	1	2	3	4	Total
Shock	6	24	8	8	46
Rattlers	6	28	14	20	68

at US Airways Center, Phoenix, Arizona

- Date: July 2
- Game time: 5:05 p.m. PDT
- Game attendance: 9,173
- Referee: Shawn Hochuli
- Recap

Game information

1st quarter

- Arizona – (8:15) Rod Windsor 3-yard pass from Nick Davila, Arizona 6–0
- Spokane – (4:25) Chas Gessner 17-yard pass from Erik Meyer, Tied 6–6

2nd quarter

- Arizona – (14:14) Odie Armstrong 3-yard pass from Nick Davila (Fabrizio Scaccia kick), Arizona 13–6
- Spokane – (11:19) Adron Tennell 27-yard pass from Erik Meyer (Taylor Rowan kick), Tied 13–13
- Arizona – (8:53) Rod Windsor 6-yard pass from Nick Davila (Fabrizio Scaccia kick), Arizona 20–13
- Spokane – (5:29) Erik Meyer 11-yard run (Taylor Rowan kick), Tied 20–20
- Arizona – (2:55) Jason Geathers 5-yard pass from Nick Davila (Fabrizio Scaccia kick), Arizona 27–20
- Spokane – (0:30) Adron Tennell 16-yard pass from Erik Meyer (Micah King kick), Tied 27–27
- Arizona – (0:18) Jason Geathers 14-yard pass from Nick Davila (Fabrizio Scaccia kick), Arizona 34–27
- Spokane – (0:00) Taylor Rowan 24-yard field goal, Arizona 34–30

3rd quarter

- Arizona – (9:29) Rod Windsor 13-yard pass from Nick Davila (Fabrizio Scaccia kick), Arizona 41–30
- Spokane – (5:28) Adron Tennell 11-yard pass from Erik Meyer (Erik Meyer pass), Arizona 41–38
- Arizona – (3:40) Jason Geathers 11-yard pass from Nick Davila (Fabrizio Scaccia kick), Arizona 48–38

4th quarter

- Arizona – (14:38) Odie Armstrong 6-yard run (Fabrizio Scaccia kick failed), Arizona 54–38
- Arizona – (10:06) Kerry Reed 25-yard pass from Nick Davila (Fabrizio Scaccia kick), Arizona 61–38
- Spokane – (6:15) Emery Sammons 16-yard pass from Kyle Rowley (Kyle Rowley rush), Arizona 61–46
- Arizona – (1:48) Rod Windsor 44-yard pass from Nick Davila (Fabrizio Scaccia kick), Arizona 68–46

Passing

- Spokane – Erik Meyer: 21/30, 243 yards, 4 TD, 1 INT
- Arizona – Nick Davila: 23/29, 291 yards, 9 TD

Rushing

- Spokane – Erik Meyer: 3 att, 13 yards, 1 TD
- Arizona – Odie Armstrong: 6 att, 23 yards, 1 TD

Receiving

- Spokane – Adron Tennell: 11 rec, 160 yards, 3 TD
- Arizona – Rod Windsor: 9 rec, 125 yards, 4 TD

=== Week 18: vs. Utah Blaze ===
Week 18: Utah Blaze at Spokane Shock – Game summary

Quarter	1	2	3	4	Total
Blaze	14	21	7	7	49
Shock	14	35	13	14	76

at Joe Albi Stadium, Spokane, Washington

- Date: July 9
- Game time: 6:00 p.m. PDT
- Game attendance: 16,233
- Referee: Shane Anderson
- Recap

Game information

1st quarter

- Spokane – (13:12) Antwan Marsh 3-yard run (Taylor Rowan kick), Spokane 7–0
- Utah – (10:12) Aaron Lesue 13-yard pass from Todd Hammel (Kyle Brotzman kick), Tied 7–7
- Spokane – (4:56) Adron Tennell 6-yard pass from Erik Meyer (Taylor Rowan kick), Spokane 14–7
- Utah – (0:29) Alvance Robinson 4-yard pass from Todd Hammel (Kyle Brotzman kick), Tied 14–14

2nd quarter

- Spokane – (11:42) Erik Meyer 3-yard run (Taylor Rowan kick), Spokane 21–14
- Spokane – (9:52) Chas Gessner 24-yard pass from Erik Meyer (Taylor Rowan kick), Spokane 28–14
- Utah – (6:10) Ben Stallings 1-yard run (Kyle Brotzman kick), Spokane 28–21
- Spokane – (5:07) Brandon Thompkins 45-yard pass from Erik Meyer (Taylor Rowan kick), Spokane 35–21
- Utah – (2:47) Aaron Lesue 15-yard pass from Todd Hammel (Kyle Brotzman kick), Spokane 35–28
- Spokane – (1:20) Adron Tennell 11-yard pass from Erik Meyer (Taylor Rowan kick), Spokane 42–28
- Utah – (0:52) Michael Preston 39-yard pass from Todd Hammel (Kyle Brotzman kick), Spokane 42–35
- Spokane – (0:02) Emery Sammons 11-yard pass from Erik Meyer (Taylor Rowan kick), Spokane 49–35

3rd quarter

- Spokane – (11:40) Adron Tennell 6-yard pass from Erik Meyer (Taylor Rowan kick failed), Spokane 55–35
- Utah – (7:27) Ben Stallings 1-yard run (Kyle Brotzman kick), Spokane 55–42
- Spokane – (5:02) Erik Meyer 1-yard run (Taylor Rowan kick), Spokane 62–42

4th quarter

- Spokane – (11:52) Adron Tennell 25-yard pass from Kyle Rowley (Taylor Rowan kick), Spokane 69–42
- Utah – (9:57) Michael Preston 37-yard pass from Todd Hammel (Kyle Brotzman kick), Spokane 69–49
- Spokane – (2:53) Adron Tennell 7-yard pass from Kyle Rowley (Taylor Rowan kick), Spokane 76–49

Passing

- Utah – Todd Hammel: 23/34, 161 yards, 4 TD, 2 INT
- Spokane – Erik Meyer: 15/19, 166 yards, 6 TD

Rushing

- Utah – Ben Stallings: 8 att, 44 yards, 2 TD
- Spokane – Erik Meyer: 4 att, 17 yards, 2 TD

Receiving

- Utah – Michael Preston: 9 rec, 132 yards, 2 TD
- Spokane – Adron Tennell: 10 rec, 82 yards, 5 TD

=== Week 19: vs. San Jose SaberCats ===
Week 19: San Jose SaberCats at Spokane Shock – Game summary

Quarter	1	2	3	4	Total
SaberCats	21	14	6	20	61
Shock	6	21	7	29	63

at Spokane Veterans Memorial Arena, Spokane, Washington

- Date: July 16
- Game time: 7:00 p.m. PDT
- Game attendance: 9,680
- Referee: Shane Anderson
- Recap

Game information

1st quarter

- San Jose – (14:00) James Roe 7-yard pass from Mark Grieb (Juan Gamboa kick), San Jose 7–0
- Spokane – (9:45) Kyle Rowley 1-yard run (Taylor Rowan kick failed), San Jose 7–6
- San Jose – (5:06) Victor James 3-yard run (Juan Gamboa kick), San Jose 14–6
- San Jose – (1:07) Victor James 5-yard run (Juan Gamboa kick), San Jose 21–6

2nd quarter

- Spokane – (12:07) Randy Hymes 3-yard pass from Kyle Rowley (Taylor Rowan kick), San Jose 21–13
- Spokane – (0:53) Brandon Thompkins 22-yard pass from Kyle Rowley (Taylor Rowan kick), San Jose 21–20
- San Jose – (0:33) Ben Nelson 8-yard pass from Mark Grieb (Juan Gamboa kick), San Jose 28–20
- Spokane – (0:19) Adron Tennell 17-yard pass from Kyle Rowley (Taylor Rowan kick), San Jose 28–27
- San Jose – (0:00) James Roe 14-yard pass from Mark Grieb (Juan Gamboa kick), San Jose 35–27

3rd quarter

- San Jose – (10:14) James Roe 26-yard pass from Mark Grieb (Juan Gamboa kick blocked), San Jose 41–27
- Spokane – (5:10) Adron Tennell 2-yard pass from Kyle Rowley (Taylor Rowan kick), San Jose 41–34

4th quarter

- Spokane – (14:55) Brandon Thompkins 19-yard pass from Kyle Rowley (Taylor Rowan kick blocked), San Jose 41–40
- San Jose – (9:54) Marco Thomas 1-yard pass from Mark Grieb (Juan Gamboa kick), San Jose 48–40
- Spokane – (7:00) Randy Hymes 4-yard pass from Kyle Rowley (Taylor Rowan kick), San Jose 48–47
- San Jose – (4:18) Ben Nelson 9-yard pass from Mark Grieb (Juan Gamboa kick), San Jose 55–47
- Spokane – (1:31) Randy Hymes 1-yard pass from Kyle Rowley (Brandon Thompkins rush), Tied 55–55
- Spokane – (0:58) Team safety, Spokane 57–55
- San Jose – (0:04) James Roe 11-yard pass from Mark Grieb (Mark Grieb rush failed), San Jose 61–57
- Spokane – (0:00) Randy Hymes 34-yard pass from Kyle Rowley (Kyle Rowley rush failed), Spokane 63–61

Passing

- San Jose – Mark Grieb: 32/44, 315 yards, 7 TD
- Spokane – Kyle Rowley: 24/31, 281 yards, 8 TD

Rushing

- San Jose – Victor James: 4 att, 6 yards, 2 TD
- Spokane – Randy Hymes: 1 att, 3 yards

Receiving

- San Jose – James Roe: 11 rec, 132 yards, 4 TD
- Spokane – Randy Hymes: 12 rec, 100 yards, 4 TD

=== Week 20: at Jacksonville Sharks ===
Week 20: Spokane Shock at Jacksonville Sharks – Game summary

Quarter	1	2	3	4	Total
Shock	8	18	14	16	56
Sharks	13	20	21	21	75

at Jacksonville Veterans Memorial Arena, Jacksonville, Florida

- Date: July 22
- Game time: 5:00 p.m. PDT
- Game attendance: 10,025
- Referee: Scott Vaughn
- Recap

Game information

1st quarter

- Jacksonville – (15:00) Jeff Hughley 57-yard kickoff return (Marco Capozzoli kick), Jacksonville 7–0
- Spokane – (10:42) Randy Hymes 11-yard pass from Kyle Rowley (Taylor Rowan drop-kick), Spokane 8–7
- Jacksonville – (3:21) Jamarko Simmons 4-yard pass from Aaron Garcia (Marco Capozzoli kick failed), Jacksonville 13–8

2nd quarter

- Spokane – (14:54) Chris Pino 17-yard pass from Kyle Rowley (Taylor Rowan drop-kick failed), Spokane 14–13
- Spokane – (6:40) Taylor Rowan 23-yard field goal, Spokane 17–13
- Jacksonville – (5:29) Jeff Hughley 31-yard pass from Aaron Garcia (Marco Capozzoli kick), Jacksonville 20–17
- Spokane – (1:12) Adron Tennell 7-yard pass from Kyle Rowley (Taylor Rowan kick blocked), Spokane 23–20
- Jacksonville – (0:55) Jamarko Simmons 9-yard pass from Aaron Garcia (Marco Capozzoli kick failed), Jacksonville 26–23
- Spokane – (0:38) Taylor Rowan 18-yard field goal, Tied 26–26
- Jacksonville – (0:28) Jomo Wilson 8-yard pass from Aaron Garcia (Marco Capozzoli kick), Jacksonville 33–26

3rd quarter

- Jacksonville – (11:17) Kevin Concepcion 31-yard pass from Omar Jacobs (Marco Capozzoli kick), Jacksonville 40–26
- Spokane – (8:53) Greg Orton 45-yard pass from Kyle Rowley (Taylor Rowan kick), Jacksonville 40–33
- Jacksonville – (6:33) Jeff Hughley 19-yard pass from Omar Jacobs (Marco Capozzoli kick), Jacksonville 47–33
- Jacksonville – (4:16) Jamarko Simmons 19-yard pass from Omar Jacobs (Marco Capozzoli kick), Jacksonville 54–33
- Spokane – (0:02) Greg Orton 1-yard pass from Steven Sheffield (Taylor Rowan kick), Jacksonville 54–40

4th quarter

- Jacksonville – (14:18) Jamarko Simmons 6-yard pass from Omar Jacobs (Marco Capozzoli kick), Jacksonville 61–40
- Spokane – (11:52) Greg Orton 36-yard pass from Steven Sheffield (Steven Sheffield rush), Jacksonville 61–48
- Jacksonville – (9:33) Jamarko Simmons 1-yard run (Marco Capozzoli kick), Jacksonville 68–48
- Jacksonville – (5:53) Sale' Key 36-yard interception return (Marco Capozzoli kick), Jacksonville 75–48
- Spokane – (2:10) Randy Hymes 7-yard pass from Steven Sheffield (Steven Sheffield pass), Jacksonville 75–56

Passing

- Spokane – Kyle Rowley: 23/36, 251 yards, 4 TD, 1 INT
- Jacksonville – Aaron Garcia: 12/20, 117 yards, 4 TD

Rushing

- Spokane – Micah King: 3 att, 11 yards
- Jacksonville – Omar Jacobs: 2 att, 2 yards

Receiving

- Spokane – Greg Orton: 8 rec, 119 yards, 3 TD
- Jacksonville – Jeff Hughley: 7 rec, 98 yards, 2 TD

== Playoffs ==
=== National Conference Semifinals: at (1) Arizona Rattlers ===
National Conference Semifinals: Spokane Shock at Arizona Rattlers – Game summary

Quarter	1	2	3	4	Total
(4) Shock	7	6	7	13	33
(1) Rattlers	7	14	14	27	62

at US Airways Center, Phoenix, Arizona

- Date: July 29
- Game time: 7:00 p.m. PDT
- Game attendance: 7,105
- Referee: Scott Vaughn
- Recap

Game information

1st quarter

- Spokane – (4:57) Randy Hymes 21-yard pass from Kyle Rowley (Taylor Rowan kick), Spokane 7–0
- Arizona – (4:02) Virgil Gray 54-yard kickoff return (Jason Witczak kick), Tied 7–7

2nd quarter

- Arizona – (5:35) Jason Geathers 6-yard pass from Nick Davila (Jason Witczak kick), Arizona 14–7
- Spokane – (2:08) Greg Orton 6-yard pass from Kyle Rowley (Taylor Rowan kick failed), Arizona 14–13
- Arizona – (0:08) Glen Fox 2-yard pass from Nick Davila (Jason Witczak kick), Arizona 21–13

3rd quarter

- Spokane – (7:59) Randy Hymes 18-yard pass from Kyle Rowley (Taylor Rowan kick), Arizona 21–20
- Arizona – (4:43) Kerry Reed 21-yard pass from Nick Davila (Jason Witczak kick), Arizona 28–20
- Arizona – (1:20) Odie Armstrong 5-yard run (Jason Witczak kick), Arizona 35–20

4th quarter

- Spokane – (13:09) Greg Orton 35-yard pass from Kyle Rowley (Taylor Rowan pass failed), Arizona 35–26
- Arizona – (10:45) Kerry Reed 6-yard pass from Nick Davila (Jason Witczak kick), Arizona 42–26
- Arizona – (7:52) Kevin McCullough 12-yard interception return (John Booker rush failed), Arizona 48–26
- Spokane – (4:16) Greg Orton 31-yard pass from Steve Sheffield (Taylor Rowan kick), Arizona 48–33
- Arizona – (2:29) Odie Armstrong 1-yard run (Jason Witczak kick), Arizona 55–33
- Arizona – (0:27) Marquis Floyd 40-yard interception return (Jason Witczak kick), Arizona 62–33

Passing

- Spokane – Kyle Rowley: 25/45, 210 yards, 4 TD, 3 INT
- Arizona – Nick Davila: 15/24, 167 yards, 4 TD, 2 INT

Rushing

- Spokane – Steve Sheffield: 1 att, 12 yards
- Arizona – Odie Armstrong: 5 att, 32 yards, 2 TD

Receiving

- Spokane – Randy Hymes: 12 rec, 110 yards, 2 TD
- Arizona – Kerry Reed: 6 rec, 80 yards, 2 TD
