= 2011 Arizona Rattlers season =

Indoor football season

- Head coach: Kevin Guy
- Home stadium: US Airways Center

Results
- Record: 16–2
- Division place: 1st
- Playoffs: Won Conference Semifinals (Shock) 62–33; Won Conference Championship (Rush) 54–48; Lost ArenaBowl XXIV (Sharks) 70–73
- Team MVP: Nick Davila

The 2011 Arizona Rattlers season was the 20th season for the franchise in the Arena Football League. The team was coached by Kevin Guy and played their home games at US Airways Center. In the regular season, the Rattlers won a league-record 16 games, having lost only two, to secure home-field advantage throughout the playoffs. They defeated the Spokane Shock in the conference semifinals before beating the Chicago Rush in the conference championship. In ArenaBowl XXIV however, they fell to the Jacksonville Sharks, giving up a game-winning touchdown with no time left on the clock.

== Final roster ==
2011 Arizona Rattlers roster
| Quarterbacks: 10 Nick Davila; Fullbacks: 32 Odie Armstrong; Wide receivers: 18 Glen Fox; 3 Jason Geathers; 81 Chris Jackson; 15 Kerry Reed | Offensive linemen: 54 John Booker; 55 Brennan Carvalho; 64 Devin Clark; Defensive linemen: 98 Kyle Harrington; 77 Anttaj Hawthorne; 70 Marcus Pittman | Linebackers: 94 Tyre Glasper; 20 Kevin McCullough; Defensive backs: 19 Marquis Floyd; 4 Virgil Gray; 6 Vince Hill; 21 Riley Swanson; Kickers: 11 Jason Witczak | Injured reserve: Currently vacant; Team suspended: Currently vacant; Refuse to report: Currently vacant; Other league exempt: Currently vacant; Inactive reserve: Currently vacant; Recallable reassignment: Currently vacant; Rookies in italics Roster updated July 23, 2011; 19 Active, 0 Inactive |

== Standings ==
West Division
| Team | W | L | PCT | PF | PA | DIV | CON | Home | Away |
| z-Arizona Rattlers | 16 | 2 | .889 | 1114 | 836 | 5–1 | 9–2 | 8–1 | 8–1 |
| x-Spokane Shock | 9 | 9 | .500 | 1057 | 1027 | 3–3 | 6–5 | 7–2 | 2–7 |
| Utah Blaze | 9 | 9 | .500 | 1082 | 1117 | 2–4 | 4–7 | 7–2 | 2–7 |
| San Jose SaberCats | 7 | 11 | .389 | 1022 | 1080 | 2–4 | 4–7 | 6–3 | 1–8 |

z - Clinched division and conference's best record
x - Clinched playoff berth

== Schedule ==
=== Regular season ===
The Rattlers began the season at home against the Jacksonville Sharks on March 12. They visited the Dallas Vigilantes in their final regular season game.

| Week | Day | Date | Kickoff | Opponent | Results | | Location | Report |
| Week | Day | Date | Kickoff | Opponent | Score | Record | Location | Report |
|---|---|---|---|---|---|---|---|---|
| 1 | Saturday | March 12 | 7:00 p.m. MST | Jacksonville Sharks | W 55–52 | 1–0 | US Airways Center | |
| 2 | Saturday | March 19 | 7:05 p.m. MST | Milwaukee Mustangs | W 62–31 | 2–0 | US Airways Center | |
| 3 | Monday | March 28 | 7:00 p.m. MST | at Tulsa Talons | W 69–20 | 3–0 | BOK Center | |
| 4 | Saturday | April 2 | 7:00 p.m. MST | Orlando Predators | W 48–47 | 4–0 | US Airways Center | |
| 5 | Bye | | | | | | | |
| 6 | Saturday | April 16 | 5:00 p.m. MST | at Kansas City Command | W 63–49 | 5–0 | Sprint Center | |
| 7 | Saturday | April 23 | 7:00 p.m. MST | Utah Blaze | W 67–61 (OT) | 6–0 | US Airways Center | |
| 8 | Saturday | April 30 | 7:00 p.m. MST | at Spokane Shock | L 69–70 | 6–1 | Spokane Veterans Memorial Arena | |
| 9 | Saturday | May 7 | 7:30 p.m. MST | at San Jose SaberCats | W 65–43 | 7–1 | HP Pavilion at San Jose | |
| 10 | Saturday | May 14 | 7:00 p.m. MST | Chicago Rush | L 49–50 | 7–2 | US Airways Center | |
| 11 | Friday | May 20 | 5:00 p.m. MST | at New Orleans VooDoo | W 61–53 | 8–2 | New Orleans Arena | |
| 12 | Saturday | May 28 | 7:00 p.m. MST | Cleveland Gladiators | W 63–42 | 9–2 | US Airways Center | |
| 13 | Saturday | June 4 | 6:00 p.m. MST | at Utah Blaze | W 72–37 | 10–2 | EnergySolutions Arena | |
| 14 | Saturday | June 11 | 5:05 p.m. MST | Iowa Barnstormers | W 61–41 | 11–2 | US Airways Center | |
| 15 | Saturday | June 18 | 7:00 p.m. MST | San Jose SaberCats | W 64–57 | 12–2 | US Airways Center | |
| 16 | Saturday | June 25 | 4:05 p.m. MST | at Philadelphia Soul | W 55–54 | 13–2 | Wells Fargo Center | |
| 17 | Saturday | July 2 | 7:05 p.m. MST | Spokane Shock | W 68–46 | 14–2 | US Airways Center | |
| 18 | Sunday | July 10 | 4:30 p.m. MST | at Pittsburgh Power | W 68–34 | 15–2 | Consol Energy Center | |
| 19 | Bye | | | | | | | |
| 20 | Saturday | July 23 | 5:30 p.m. MST | at Dallas Vigilantes | W 55–49 | 16–2 | American Airlines Center | |

=== Playoffs ===
| Round | Day | Date | Kickoff | Opponent | Results | Location | Report |
|---|---|---|---|---|---|---|---|
| NC Semifinals | Friday | July 29 | 7:00 p.m. MST | Spokane Shock | W 62–33 | US Airways Center | |
| NC Championship | Saturday | August 6 | 7:00 p.m. MST | Chicago Rush | W 54–48 | US Airways Center | |
| ArenaBowl XXIV | Friday | August 12 | 5:30 p.m. MST | Jacksonville Sharks | L 70–73 | US Airways Center | |

== Regular season ==
=== Week 1: vs. Jacksonville Sharks ===
Week 1: Jacksonville Sharks at Arizona Rattlers – Game summary

| Quarter | 1 | 2 | 3 | 4 | Total |
|---|---|---|---|---|---|
| Sharks | 16 | 14 | 7 | 15 | 52 |
| Rattlers | 6 | 19 | 8 | 22 | 55 |

at US Airways Center, Phoenix, Arizona

- Date: March 12
- Game time: 7:00 p.m. MST
- Game attendance: 8,428
- Recap

Game information

1st quarter

- Jacksonville – (11:11) Marco Capozzoli 28-yard field goal, Jacksonville 3–0
- Jacksonville – (6:45) Omar Jacobs 1-yard run (Marco Capozzoli kick failed), Jacksonville 9–0
- Arizona – (4:35) Trandon Harvey 30-yard pass from Nick Davilla, (Joe Schroeder kick failed), Jacksonville 9–6
- Jacksonville – (2:14) Jeron Harvey 43-yard pass from Aaron Garcia (Marco Capozzoli kick), Jacksonville 16–6

2nd quarter

- Arizona – (12:01) Trandon Harvey 9-yard pass from Nick Davilla (Joe Schroeder kick), Jacksonville 16–13
- Jacksonville – (8:50) Jeron Harvey 9-yard pass from Aaron Garcia (Marco Capozzoli kick), Jacksonville 23–13
- Arizona – (5:01) Nick Davila 6-yard run (Joe Schroeder kick failed), Jacksonville 23–19
- Jacksonville – (2:20) Jomo Wilson 12-yard pass from Aaron Garcia (Marco Capozzoli kick), Jacksonville 30–19
- Arizona – (0:00) Nate Forse 16-yard pass from Nick Davila (Joe Schroeder kick failed), Jacksonville 30–25

3rd quarter

- Jacksonville – (7:00) Jomo Wilson 2-yard run (Marco Capozzoli kick), Jacksonville 37–25
- Arizona – (2:40) Trandon Harvey 9-yard pass from Nick Davila (Odie Armstrong run), Jacksonville 37–33

4th quarter

- Jacksonville – (14:16) Marco Capozzoli 27-yard field goal, Jacksonville 40–33
- Arizona – (10:06) Trandon Harvey 15-yard pass from Nick Davila (Joe Schroeder kick), Tied 40–40
- Jacksonville – (6:14) Sale' Key 7-yard pass from Aaron Garcia (Marco Capozzoli kick failed), Jacksonville 46–40
- Arizona – (5:17) Virgil Gray 57-yard kickoff return (Joe Schroeder kick), Arizona 47–46
- Jacksonville – (1:20) Jomo Wilson 34-yard pass from Aaron Garcia (Aaron Garcia pass failed), Jacksonville 52–47
- Arizona – (0:31) Jason Geathers 9-yard pass from Nick Davila (Trandon Harvey run), Arizona 55–52

Passing

- Jacksonville – Aaron Garcia: 24/39, 259 yards, 5 TD, 2 INT
- Arizona – Nick Davila: 27/46, 284 yards, 6 TD

Rushing

- Jacksonville – Kirby Griffin: 6 att, 26 yards
- Arizona – Nick Davila: 2 att, 3 yards, 1 TD

Receiving

- Jacksonville – Jeron Harvey: 9 rec, 110 yards, 2 TD
- Arizona – Trandon Harvey: 12 rec, 130 yards, 4 TD

=== Week 2: vs. Milwaukee Mustangs ===
Week 2: Milwaukee Mustangs at Arizona Rattlers – Game summary

| Quarter | 1 | 2 | 3 | 4 | Total |
|---|---|---|---|---|---|
| Mustangs | 7 | 10 | 7 | 7 | 31 |
| Rattlers | 7 | 17 | 14 | 24 | 62 |

at US Airways Center, Phoenix, Arizona

- Date: March 19
- Game time: 7:05 p.m. MST
- Game attendance: 9,108
- Referee: David Cutaia
- Recap

Game information

1st quarter

- Milwaukee – (6:05) Eric Ward 2-yard run (Garrett Lindholm kick), Milwaukee 7–0
- Arizona – (2:38) Jason Geathers 8-yard pass from Nick Davila (Joe Schroeder kick), Tied 7–7

2nd quarter

- Milwaukee – (12:53) Garrett Lindholm 21-yard field goal, Milwaukee 10–7
- Arizona – (8:37) Team safety, Milwaukee 10–9
- Arizona – (4:08) Nate Forse 18-yard pass from Nick Davila (Joe Schroeder kick), Arizona 16–10
- Milwaukee – (1:38) Eric Ward 1-yard run (Garrett Lindholm kick), Milwaukee 17–16
- Arizona – (0:00) Nate Forse 11-yard pass from Nick Davila (Trevor Harris rush), Arizona 24–17

3rd quarter

- Arizona – (12:26) Trandon Harvey 10-yard pass from Nick Davila (Joe Schroeder kick), Arizona 31–17
- Milwaukee – (6:38) Brent Holmes 5-yard pass from Eric Ward (Garrett Lindholm kick), Arizona 31–24
- Arizona – (4:16) Rod Windsor 35-yard pass from Nick Davila (Joe Schroeder kick), Arizona 38–24

4th quarter

- Arizona – (13:31) Joe Schroeder 35-yard field goal, Arizona 41–24
- Milwaukee – (10:16) Eric Ward 1-yard run (Garrett Lindholm kick), Arizona 41–31
- Arizona – (8:31) Rod Windsor 21-yard pass from Nick Davila (Joe Schroeder kick), Arizona 48–31
- Arizona – (3:46) Nate Forse 6-yard pass from Nick Davila (Joe Schroeder kick), Arizona 55–31
- Arizona – (0:49) Amtajj Hawthorne 2-yard fumble recovery (Joe Schroeder kick), Arizona 62–31

Passing

- Milwaukee – Eric Ward: 17/31, 181 yards, 1 TD, 2 INT
- Arizona – Nick Davila: 22/36, 286 yards, 6 TD, 1 TD

Rushing

- Milwaukee – Eric Ward: 4 att, 6 yards, 3 TD
- Arizona – Odie Armstrong: 2 att, 6 yards

Receiving

- Milwaukee – Damian Harrell: 5 rec, 79 yards
- Arizona – Rod Windsor: 4 rec, 101 yards, 2 TD

=== Week 3: at Tulsa Talons ===
Week 3: Arizona Rattlers at Tulsa Talons – Game summary

| Quarter | 1 | 2 | 3 | 4 | Total |
|---|---|---|---|---|---|
| Rattlers | 19 | 23 | 7 | 20 | 69 |
| Talons | 0 | 0 | 6 | 14 | 20 |

at BOK Center, Tulsa, Oklahoma

- Date: March 28
- Game time: 7:00 p.m. MST
- Game attendance: 9,311
- Referee: Joe Pester
- Recap

Game information

1st quarter

- Arizona – (10:28) Odie Armstrong 3-yard run (Joe Schroeder kick failed), Arizona 6–0
- Arizona – (2:43) Nate Forse 3-yard pass from Nick Davila (Joe Schroeder kick), Arizona 13–0
- Arizona – (0:09) Kevin McCullough 10-yard interception return (Joe Schroeder kick failed), Arizona 19–0

2nd quarter

- Arizona – (12:23) Trandon Harvey 38-yard pass from Nick Davila (Joe Schroeder kick), Arizona 26–0
- Arizona – (10:27) Team safety, Arizona 28–0
- Arizona – (8:04) Rod Windsor 5-yard pass from Nick Davila (Joe Schroeder kick), Arizona 35–0
- Arizona – (0:20) Trandon Harvey 15-yard pass from Nick Davila (Joe Schroeder kick), Arizona 42–0

3rd quarter

- Tulsa – (8:45) T.J. Williams 6-yard pass from Bobby Reid (Juan Bongarra kick failed), Arizona 42–6
- Arizona – (5:38) Trandon Harvey 32-yard pass from Trevor Harris (Joe Schroeder kick), Arizona 49–6

4th quarter

- Tulsa – (14:52) Jamar Ransom 2-yard run (Jamar Ransom rush), Arizona 49–14
- Arizona – (9:59) Trandon Harvey 12-yard pass from Trevor Harris (Joe Schroeder kick), Arizona 56–14
- Arizona – (7:22) Odie Armstrong 1-yard run (Joe Schroeder kick failed), Arizona 62–14
- Tulsa – (0:40) T.J. Williams 28-yard pass from Matt Baussener (Juan Bongarra rush failed), Arizona 62–20
- Arizona – (0:24) Jason Geathers 15-yard pass from Trevor Harris (Joe Schroeder kick), Arizona 69–20

Passing

- Arizona – Nick Davila: 15/22, 158 yards, 4 TD
- Tulsa – Aaron Garcia: 15/32, 108 yards, 2 TD, 4 INT

Rushing

- Arizona – Odie Armstrong: 7 att, 10 yards, 1 TD
- Tulsa – Bobby Reid: 5 att, 29 yards

Receiving

- Arizona – Trandon Harvey: 11 rec, 150 yards, 4 TD
- Tulsa – T.J. Williams: 8 rec, 92 yards, 2 TD

=== Week 4: vs. Orlando Predators ===
Week 4: Orlando Predators at Arizona Rattlers – Game summary

| Quarter | 1 | 2 | 3 | 4 | Total |
|---|---|---|---|---|---|
| Predators | 21 | 6 | 14 | 6 | 47 |
| Rattlers | 0 | 12 | 14 | 22 | 48 |

at US Airways Center, Phoenix, Arizona

- Date: April 2
- Game time: 7:00 p.m. MST
- Game attendance: 9,977
- Referee: Shane Anderson
- Recap

Game information

1st quarter

- Orlando – (9:08) Marlon Moye-Moore 1-yard run (Mark Lewis kick), Orlando 7–0
- Orlando – (3:22) T.T. Toliver 20-yard pass from Nick Hill (Mark Lewis kick), Orlando 14–0
- Orlando – (1:57) Marlon Moye-Moore 21-yard interception return (Mark Lewis kick), Orlando 21–0

2nd quarter

- Arizona – (14:58) Nate Forse 3-yard pass from Nick Davila (Joe Schroeder kick failed), Orlando 21–6
- Orlando – (9:20) Bobby Sippio 8-yard pass from Nick Hill, Orlando 27–6
- Arizona – (7:40) Trandon Harvey 28-yard pass from Nick Davila (Trevor Harris rush failed), Orlando 27–12

3rd quarter

- Arizona – (12:01) Trandon Harvey 4-yard pass from Nick Davila (Joe Schroeder kick), Orlando 27–19
- Orlando – (9:43) Robert Quiroga 25-yard pass from Nick Hill (Mark Lewis kick), Orlando 34–19
- Arizona – (4:00) Trandon Harvey 4-yard pass from Nick Davila (Joe Schroeder kick), Orlando 34–26
- Orlando – (0:46) T.T. Toliver 5-yard pass from Nick Hill (Mark Lewis kick), Orlando 41–26

4th quarter

- Arizona – (12:36) Trandon Harvey 29-yard pass from Nick Davila (Nick Davila pass), Orlando 41–34
- Orlando – (10:48) Robert Quiroga 14-yard pass from Nick Hill (Mark Lewis kick failed), Orlando 47–34
- Arizona – (5:41) Odie Armstrong 1-yard run (Joe Schroeder kick failed), Orlando 47–40
- Arizona – (0:08) Jason Geathers 14-yard pass from Nick Davila (Joe Schroeder pass), Arizona 48–47

Passing

- Orlando – Nick Hill: 24/34, 312 yards, 5 TD, 2 INT
- Arizona – Nick Davila: 25/39, 344 yards, 6 TD, 3 INT

Rushing

- Orlando – Nick Hill: 9 att, 17 yards
- Arizona – Odie Armstrong: 2 att, 1 yard, 1 TD

Receiving

- Orlando – Bobby Sippio: 12 rec, 149 yards, 1 TD
- Arizona – Trandon Harvey: 9 rec, 117 yards, 4 TD

=== Week 6: at Kansas City Command ===
Week 6: Arizona Rattlers at Kansas City Command – Game summary

| Quarter | 1 | 2 | 3 | 4 | Total |
|---|---|---|---|---|---|
| Rattlers | 21 | 7 | 14 | 21 | 63 |
| Command | 7 | 14 | 14 | 14 | 49 |

at Sprint Center, Kansas City, Missouri

- Date: April 16
- Game time: 5:00 p.m. MST
- Game attendance: 4,166
- Referee: Larry Smith
- Recap

Game information

1st quarter

- Arizona – (13:56) Rod Windsor 28-yard pass from Nick Davila (Fabrizio Scaccia kick), Arizona 7–0
- Kansas City – (9:25) Steven Savoy 11-yard pass from J.J. Raterink (Brian Umstead kick), Tied 7–7
- Arizona – (3:43) Rod Winsor 2-yard pass from Nick Davila (Fabrizio Scaccia kick), Arizona 14–7
- Arizona – (0:25) Odie Armstrong 1-yard run (Fabrizio Scaccia kick), Arizona 21–7

2nd quarter

- Kansas City – (9:52) Aaron Hosack 13-yard pass from J.J. Raterink (Brian Umstead kick), Arizona 21–14
- Arizona – (5:26) Kerry Reed 3-yard pass from Nick Davila (Fabrizio Scaccia kick), Arizona 28–14
- Kansas City – (2:32) Steven Savoy 20-yard pass from J.J. Raterink (Brian Umstead kick), Arizona 28–21

3rd quarter

- Kansas City – (14:49) Christian Wise 54-yard kickoff return (Brian Umstead kick), Tied 28–28
- Arizona – (13:09) Rod Winsor 22-yard pass from Nick Davila (Fabrizio Scaccia kick), Arizona 35–28
- Kansas City – (7:54) Bret Smith 8-yard pass from J.J. Raterink (Brian Umstead kick), Tied 35–35
- Arizona – (7:11) Trandon Harvey 57-yard kickoff return (Fabrizio Scaccia kick), Arizona 42–35

4th quarter

- Arizona – (14:58) Trandon Harvey 2-yard pass from Nick Davila (Fabrizio Scaccia kick), Arizona 49–35
- Kansas City – (13:03) Aaron Hosack 0-yard fumble recovery (Brian Umstead kick), Arizona 49–42
- Arizona – (9:54) Rod Windsor 11-yard pass from Nick Davila (Fabrizio Scaccia kick), Arizona 56–42
- Arizona – (5:23) Rod Windsor 14-yard pass from Nick Davila (Fabrizio Scaccia kick), Arizona 63–42
- Kansas City – (0:09) Steven Savoy 22-yard pass from J.J. Raterink (Brian Umstead kick), Arizona 63–49

Passing

- Arizona – Nick Davila: 29/36, 330 yards, 7 TD, 1 INT
- Kansas City – J.J. Raterink: 23/40, 245 yards, 6 TD, 1 INT

Rushing

- Arizona – Odie Armstrong: 2 att, 9 yards, 1 TD
- Kansas City – J.J. Raterink: 1 att, 3 yards

Receiving

- Arizona – Rod Windsor: 16 rec, 217 yards, 5 TD
- Kansas City – Steven Savoy: 8 rec, 133 yards, 3 TD

=== Week 7: vs. Utah Blaze ===
Week 7: Utah Blaze at Arizona Rattlers – Game summary

| Quarter | 1 | 2 | 3 | 4 | OT | Total |
|---|---|---|---|---|---|---|
| Blaze | 7 | 26 | 13 | 15 | 0 | 61 |
| Rattlers | 14 | 20 | 7 | 20 | 6 | 67 |

at US Airways Center, Phoenix, Arizona

- Date: April 23
- Game time: 7:00 p.m. MST
- Game attendance: 8,717
- Referee: Shane Anderson
- Recap

Game information

1st quarter

- Arizona – (11:19) Kerry Reed 4-yard pass from Nick Davila (Fabrizio Scaccia kick), Arizona 7–0
- Utah – (8:18) Alvance Robinson 27-yard pass from Tommy Grady (Greg Gunderson kick), Tied 7–7
- Arizona – (3:38) Trandon Harvey 6-yard pass from Nick Davila (Fabrizio Scaccia kick), Arizona 14–7

2nd quarter

- Utah – (14:53) Alvance Robinson 21-yard pass from Tommy Grady (Greg Gunderson kick), Tied 14–14
- Arizona – (10:15) Rod Windsor 3-yard pass from Nick Davila (Fabrizio Scaccia kick), Arizona 21–14
- Utah – (9:00) Alvance Robinson 45-yard pass from Tommy Grady (Greg Gunderson kick), Tied 21–21
- Arizona – (5:07) Nick Davila 3-yard run (Fabrizio Scaccia kick), Arizona 28–21
- Utah – (3:57) Aaron Lesue 36-yard pass from Tommy Grady (Greg Gunderson kick failed), Arizona 28–27
- Arizona – (1:05) Trandon Harvey 11-yard pass from Nick Davila (Fabrizio Scaccia kick failed), Arizona 34–27
- Utah – (0:49) Aaron Lesue 6-yard pass from Tommy Grady, Arizona 34–33

3rd quarter

- Utah – (12:30) Alvance Robinson 5-yard pass from Tommy Grady (Greg Gunderson kick), Utah 40–34
- Utah – (5:44) Aaron Boone 6-yard pass from Tommy Grady (Greg Gunderson kick failed), Utah 46–34
- Arizona – (1:46) Odie Armstrong 6-yard run (Fabrizio Scaccia kick), Utah 46–41

4th quarter

- Arizona – (11:50) Odie Armstrong 7-yard run (Trevor Harris rush failed), Arizona 47–46
- Arizona – (10:19) Virgil Gray 0-yard net recovery (Fabrizio Scaccia kick), Arizona 54–46
- Utah – (4:31) Aaron Boone 4-yard pass from Tommy Grady (Greg Gunderson kick), Arizona 54–53
- Arizona – (2:29) Rod Windsor 4-yard pass from Nick Davila (Fabrizio Scaccia kick), Arizona 61–53
- Utah – (0:00) Aaron Boone 5-yard pass from Tommy Grady (Tommy Grady pass), Tied 61–61

Overtime

- Arizona – (11:19) Rod Windsor 38-yard pass from Nick Davilla, Arizona 67–61

Passing

- Utah – Tommy Grady: 30/39, 358 yards, 9 TD, 1 INT
- Arizona – Nick Hill: 35/42, 361 yards, 6 TD, 1 INT

Rushing

- Utah – Tommy Grady: 6 att, 1 yard
- Arizona – Odie Armstrong: 6 att, 28 yards, 2 TD

Receiving

- Utah – Alvance Robinson: 12 rec, 174 yards, 4 TD
- Arizona – Rod Windsor: 15 rec, 161 yards, 3 TD

=== Week 8: at Spokane Shock ===
Week 8: Arizona Rattlers at Spokane Shock – Game summary

| Quarter | 1 | 2 | 3 | 4 | Total |
|---|---|---|---|---|---|
| Rattlers | 7 | 21 | 14 | 27 | 69 |
| Shock | 7 | 21 | 21 | 21 | 70 |

at Spokane Veterans Memorial Arena, Spokane, Washington

- Date: April 30
- Game time: 7:00 p.m. MST
- Game attendance: 10,113
- Referee: Dave Cutaia
- Recap

Game information

1st quarter

- Spokane – (11:12) Kyle Rowley 1-yard run (Taylor Rowan kick), Spokane 7–0
- Arizona – (5:10) Jason Geathers 8-yard pass from Nick Davila (Fabrizio Scaccia kick), Tied 7–7

2nd quarter

- Arizona – (13:15) Odie Armstrong 1-yard run (Fabrizio Scaccia kick), Arizona 14–7
- Spokane – (7:16) Greg Orton 4-yard pass from Kyle Rowley (Taylor Rowan kick), Tied 14–14
- Arizona – (0:55) Odie Armstrong 8-yard run (Fabrizio Scaccia kick), Arizona 21–14
- Spokane – (0:47) Raul Vijil 4-yard pass from Kyle Rowley (Taylor Rowan kick), Tied 21–21
- Arizona – (0:37) Trandon Harvey 13-yard pass from Nick Davila (Fabrizio Scaccia kick), Arizona 28–21
- Spokane – (0:05) Raul Vijil 25-yard pass from Kyle Rowley (Taylor Rowan kick), Tied 28–28

3rd quarter

- Spokane – (13:35) Greg Orton 3-yard pass from Kyle Rowley (Taylor Rowan kick), Spokane 35–28
- Arizona – (9:52) Jason Geathers 20-yard pass from Nick Davila (Fabrizio Scaccia kick), Tied 35–35
- Spokane – (7:21) Shaun Kauleinamoku 24-yard pass from Kyle Rowley (Taylor Rowan kick), Spokane 42–35
- Arizona – (5:38) John Booker 6-yard pass from Nick Davila (Fabrizio Scaccia kick), Tied 42–42
- Spokane – (2:35) Raul Vijil 6-yard pass from Kyle Rowley (Taylor Rowan kick), Spokane 49–42

4th quarter

- Spokane – (14:55) Raul Vijil 4-yard pass from Kyle Rowley (Taylor Rowan kick), Spokane 56–42
- Arizona – (13:33) Trandon Harvey 24-yard pass from Nick Davila (Fabrizio Scaccia kick), Spokane 56–49
- Spokane – (9:28) Greg Orton 11-yard pass from Kyle Rowley (Taylor Rowan kick), Spokane 63–49
- Arizona – (3:32) Odie Armstrong 3-yard run (Fabrizio Scaccia kick), Spokane 63–56
- Spokane – (3:03) Raul Vijil 8-yard kickoff return (Taylor Rowan kick), Spokane 70–56
- Arizona – (0:52) Rod Windsor 4-yard pass from Nick Davila (Fabrizio Scaccia kick), Spokane 70–63
- Arizona – (0:11) Odie Armstrong 4-yard run (Nick Davila pass failed), Spokane 70–69

Passing

- Arizona – Nick Davila: 29/43, 318 yards, 6 TD
- Spokane – Kyle Rowley: 21/31, 219 yards, 8 TD, 1 INT

Rushing

- Arizona – Odie Armstrong: 9 att, 40 yards, 4 TD
- Spokane – Clay Harrell: 2 att, 9 yards

Receiving

- Arizona – Rod Windsor: 16 rec, 167 yards, 1 TD
- Spokane – Raul Vijil: 5 rec, 57 yards, 4 TD

=== Week 9: at San Jose SaberCats ===
Week 9: Arizona Rattlers at San Jose SaberCats – Game summary

| Quarter | 1 | 2 | 3 | 4 | Total |
|---|---|---|---|---|---|
| Rattlers | 14 | 14 | 3 | 34 | 65 |
| SaberCats | 13 | 7 | 7 | 16 | 43 |

at HP Pavilion at San Jose, San Jose, California

- Date: May 7
- Game time: 7:30 p.m. MST
- Game attendance: 9,499
- Referee: Steve Strimling
- Recap

Game information

1st quarter

- Arizona – (14:25) Trandon Harvey 26-yard pass from Nick Davila (Fabrizio Scaccia kick), Arizona 7–0
- San Jose – (11:03) Otis Amey 4-yard pass from Mark Grieb (Juan Gamboa kick failed), Arizona 7–6
- Arizona – (8:35) Trandon Harvey 13-yard pass from Nick Davila (Fabrizio Scaccia kick), Arizona 14–6
- San Jose – (0:26) Chad Cook 5-yard run (Juan Gamboa kick), Arizona 14–13

2nd quarter

- Arizona – (12:01) Rod Windsor 14-yard pass from Nick Davila (Fabrizio Scaccia kick), Arizona 21–13
- San Jose – (4:27) Mark Grieb 9-yard run (Juan Gamboa kick), Arizona 21–20
- Arizona – (0:24) Odie Armstrong 1-yard run (Fabrizio Scaccia kick), Arizona 28–20

3rd quarter

- Arizona – (8:16) Fabrizio Scaccia 38-yard field goal, Arizona 31–20
- San Jose – (1:49) Ben Nelson 17-yard pass from Mark Grieb (Juan Gamboa kick), Arizona 31–27

4th quarter

- Arizona – (12:51) Jason Geathers 9-yard pass from Nick Davila (Fabrizio Scaccia kick), Arizona 38–27
- San Jose – (10:22) Ben Nelson 31-yard pass from Mark Grieb (Juan Gamboa kick), Arizona 38–34
- Arizona – (9:14) Rod Windsor 43-yard pass from Nick Davila (Fabrizio Scaccia kick), Arizona 45–34
- San Jose – (6:44) Otis Amey 45-yard pass from Mark Grieb (Juan Gamboa kick), Arizona 45–41
- Arizona – (4:22) Jason Geathers 17-yard pass from Nick Davila (Fabrizio Scaccia kick blocked), Arizona 51–41
- San Jose – (4:22) Mervin Brookins PAT return, Arizona 51–43
- Arizona – (0:23) Kevin McCullough 2-yard net recovery (Fabrizio Scaccia kick), Arizona 58–43
- Arizona – (0:10) Kevin McCullough 11-yard interception return (Fabrizio Scaccia kick), Arizona 65–43

Passing

- Arizona – Nick Davila: 23/32, 266 yards, 6 TD
- San Jose – Mark Grieb: 20/38, 264 yards, 4 TD, 4 INT

Rushing

- Arizona – Odie Armstrong: 5 att, 41 yards, 1 TD
- San Jose – Mark Grieb: 2 att, 11 yards, 1 TD

Receiving

- Arizona – Rod Windsor: 9 rec, 110 yards, 2 TD
- San Jose – Amey Otis: 6 rec, 109 yards, 2 TD

=== Week 10: vs. Chicago Rush ===
Week 10: Chicago Rush at Arizona Rattlers – Game summary

| Quarter | 1 | 2 | 3 | 4 | Total |
|---|---|---|---|---|---|
| Rush | 13 | 7 | 13 | 17 | 50 |
| Rattlers | 14 | 7 | 21 | 7 | 49 |

at US Airways Center, Phoenix, Arizona

- Date: May 14
- Game time: 7:00 p.m. MST
- Game attendance: 9,000
- Referee: Shawn Hochuli
- Recap

Game information

1st quarter

- Chicago – (9:29) Reggie Gray 22-yard pass from Russ Michna (Chris Gould kick), Chicago 7–0
- Arizona – (7:37) Odie Armstrong 1-yard run (Fabrizio Scaccia kick), Tied 7–7
- Chicago – (4:17) Reggie Gray 6-yard pass from Russ Michna (Chris Gould kick failed), Chicago 13–7
- Arizona – (2:34) Rod Windsor 36-yard pass from Nick Davila (Fabrizio Scaccia kick), Arizona 14–13

2nd quarter

- Chicago – (9:21) Reggie Gray 11-yard pass from Russ Michna (Chris Gould kick), Chicago 20–14
- Arizona – (0:02) Trandon Harvey 3-yard pass from Nick Davila (Fabrizio Scaccia kick), Arizona 21–20

3rd quarter

- Arizona – (10:22) Odie Armstrong 5-yard run (Fabrizio Scaccia kick), Arizona 28–20
- Chicago – (7:44) J.J. McKelvey 7-yard pass from Russ Michna (Chris Gould kick failed), Arizona 28–26
- Arizona – (4:45) Rod Windsor 9-yard pass from Nick Davila (Fabrizio Scaccia kick), Arizona 35–26
- Chicago – (3:46) Jason Simpson −4-yard kickoff return (Chris Gould kick), Arizona 35–33
- Arizona – (1:16) Rod Windsor 8-yard pass from Nick Davila (Fabrizio Scaccia kick), Arizona 42–33

4th quarter

- Chicago – (4:37) Charles Dillon 9-yard pass from Russ Michna (Chris Gould kick), Arizona 42–40
- Arizona – (0:51) Jason Geathers 7-yard pass from Nick Davila (Fabrizio Scaccia kick), Arizona 49–40
- Chicago – (0:22) Johnie Kirton 1-yard run (Chris Gould kick), Arizona 49–47
- Chicago – (0:01) Chris Gould 33-yard field goal, Chicago 50–49

Passing

- Chicago – Russ Michna: 23/40, 267 yards, 5 TD, 2 INT
- Arizona – Nick Davila: 23/31, 297 yards, 5 TD

Rushing

- Chicago – Johnie Kirton: 6 att, 18 yards, 1 TD
- Arizona – Odie Armstrong: 6 att, 24 yards, 2 TD

Receiving

- Chicago – Reggie Gray: 9 rec, 141 yards, 3 TD
- Arizona – Rod Windsor: 9 rec, 119 yards, 3 TD

=== Week 11: at New Orleans VooDoo ===
Week 11: Arizona Rattlers at New Orleans VooDoo – Game summary

| Quarter | 1 | 2 | 3 | 4 | Total |
|---|---|---|---|---|---|
| Rattlers | 21 | 19 | 7 | 14 | 61 |
| VooDoo | 19 | 14 | 7 | 13 | 53 |

at New Orleans Arena, New Orleans, Louisiana

- Date: May 20
- Game time: 5:00 p.m. MST
- Game attendance: 8,257
- Referee: Chris Snead
- Recap

Game information

1st quarter

- New Orleans – (13:41) P.J. Berry 42-yard pass from D. Bryant (Jonathan Ruffin kick), New Orleans 7–0
- Arizona – (11:48) Trandon Harvey 25-yard pass from Nick Davila (Fabrizio Scaccia kick), Tied 7–7
- New Orleans – (11:11) Chris Wilson 30-yard pass from D. Bryant (Jonathan Ruffin kick blocked), New Orleans 13–7
- Arizona – (9:18) Jason Geathers 9-yard pass from Nick Davila (Fabrizio Scaccia kick), Arizona 14–13
- New Orleans – (5:14) Chris Wilson 16-yard pass from D. Bryant (Danny Wimprine rush failed), New Orleans 19–14
- Arizona – (2:12) Rod Windsor 4-yard pass from Nick Davila (Fabrizio Scaccia kick), Arizona 21–19

2nd quarter

- Arizona – (10:35) Trandon Harvey 5-yard pass from Nick Davila (Fabrizio Scaccia kick failed), Arizona 27–19
- New Orleans – (9:38) P.J. Berry 57-yard kickoff return (Jonathan Ruffin kick), Arizona 27–26
- Arizona – (7:04) Trandon Harvey 15-yard pass from Nick Davila (Fabrizio Scaccia kick blocked), Arizona 33–26
- New Orleans – (4:03) Chris Wilson 2-yard pass from D. Bryant (Jonathan Ruffin kick), Tied 33–33
- Arizona – (3:07) Trandon Harvey 45-yard kickoff return (Fabrizio Scaccia kick), Arizona 40–33

3rd quarter

- New Orleans – (6:22) P.J. Berry 29-yard pass from D. Bryant (Jonathan Ruffin kick), Tied 40–40
- Arizona – (1:22) Trandon Harvey 17-yard pass from Nick Davila (Fabrizio Scaccia kick), Arizona 47–40

4th quarter

- Arizona – (8:19) Rod Windsor 20-yard pass from Nick Davila (Fabrizio Scaccia kick), Arizona 54–40
- New Orleans – (4:58) P.J. Berry 13-yard pass from D. Bryant (Jonathan Ruffin kick), Arizona 54–47
- Arizona – (4:00) Marquis Floyd 10-yard kickoff return (Fabrizio Scaccia kick), Arizona 61–47
- New Orleans – (0:51) D. Bryant 1-yard run (Jonathan Ruffin kick failed), Arizona 61–53

Passing

- Arizona – Nick Davila: 26/31, 314 yards, 7 TD
- New Orleans – D. Bryant: 25/34, 285 yards, 6 TD, 3 INT

Rushing

- Arizona – Odie Armstrong: 4 att, 7 yards
- New Orleans – D. Bryant: 5 att, 26 yards, 1 TD

Receiving

- Arizona – Rod Windsor: 13 rec, 162 yards, 2 TD
- New Orleans – P.J. Berry: 12 rec, 154 yards, 3 TD

=== Week 12: vs. Cleveland Gladiators ===
Week 12: Cleveland Gladiators at Arizona Rattlers – Game summary

| Quarter | 1 | 2 | 3 | 4 | Total |
|---|---|---|---|---|---|
| Gladiators | 7 | 7 | 21 | 7 | 42 |
| Rattlers | 14 | 14 | 14 | 21 | 63 |

at US Airways Center, Phoenix, Arizona

- Date: May 28
- Game time: 7:00 p.m. MST
- Game attendance: 7,987
- Referee: Shane Anderson
- Recap

Game information

1st quarter

- Cleveland – (9:55) Kurt Rocco 6-yard run (Matt Denny kick), Cleveland 7–0
- Arizona – (8:22) Jason Geathers 18-yard pass from Nick Davila (Fabrizio Scaccia kick), Tied 7–7
- Arizona – (2:56) Trandon Harvey 22-yard pass from Nick Davila (Fabrizio Scaccia kick), Arizona 14–7

2nd quarter

- Arizona – (12:28) Virgil Gray 52-yard missed field goal return (Fabrizio Scaccia kick), Arizona 21–7
- Cleveland – (7:58) Russell Monk 13-yard run (Matt Denny kick), Arizona 21–14
- Arizona – (3:58) Jason Geathers 13-yard pass from Nick Davila (Fabrizio Scaccia kick), Arizona 28–14

3rd quarter

- Cleveland – (9:31) Dominick Goodman 14-yard pass from Kurt Rocco (Matt Denny kick), Arizona 28–21
- Arizona – (7:46) Rod Windsor 2-yard pass from Nick Davila (Fabrizio Scaccia kick), Arizona 35–21
- Cleveland – (5:54) Kurt Rocco 2-yard run (Dan Whalen pass failed), Arizona 35–27
- Arizona – (2:47) Trandon Harvey 2-yard pass from Nick Davila (Fabrizio Scaccia kick), Arizona 42–27
- Cleveland – (0:43) Thyron Lewis 16-yard pass from Kurt Rocco (Kurt Rocco pass), Arizona 42–35

4th quarter

- Arizona – (11:27) Jason Geathers 3-yard pass from Nick Davila (Fabrizio Scaccia kick), Arizona 49–35
- Arizona – (7:42) Trandon Harvey 26-yard pass from Nick Davila (Fabrizio Scaccia kick failed), Arizona 55–35
- Cleveland – (3:51) Thyron Lewis 30-yard pass from Kurt Rocco (Matt Denny kick), Arizona 55–42
- Arizona – (2:46) Jason Geathers 9-yard pass from Nick Davila (John Booker rush), Arizona 63–42

Passing

- Cleveland – Kurt Rocco: 27/42, 328 yards, 3 TD, 2 INT
- Arizona – Nick Davila: 25/30, 263 yards, 8 TD, 1 INT

Rushing

- Cleveland – Russell Monk: 2 att, 13 yards, 1 TD
- Arizona – Odie Armstrong: 3 att, 7 yards

Receiving

- Cleveland – Thyron Lewis: 13 rec, 157 yards, 3 TD
- Arizona – Rod Windsor: 10 rec, 111 yards, 4 TD

=== Week 13: at Utah Blaze ===
Week 13: Arizona Rattlers at Utah Blaze – Game summary

| Quarter | 1 | 2 | 3 | 4 | Total |
|---|---|---|---|---|---|
| Rattlers | 14 | 34 | 24 | 0 | 72 |
| Blaze | 12 | 7 | 6 | 12 | 37 |

at EnergySolutions Arena, Salt Lake City, Utah

- Date: June 4
- Game time: 6:00 p.m. MST
- Game attendance: 7,997
- Referee: Shaun Hochuli
- Recap

Game information

1st quarter

- Arizona – (8:22) Trandon Harvey 12-yard pass from Nick Davila (Fabrizio Scaccia kick), Arizona 7–0
- Utah – (5:28) Ben Stallings 1-yard run (Andrew Aguila pass failed), Arizona 7–6
- Arizona – (4:15) Rod Windsor 17-yard pass from Nick Davila (Fabrizio Scaccia kick), Arizona 14–6
- Utah – (3:02) Ernest Pierce 11-yard pass from Tommy Grady (Andrew Aguila kick failed), Arizona 14–12

2nd quarter

- Arizona – (9:47) Rod Windsor 19-yard pass from Nick Davila (Fabrizio Scaccia kick), Arizona 21–12
- Arizona – (8:45) Riley Swanson 3-yard fumble recovery (Fabrizio Scaccia kick), Arizona 28–12
- Arizona – (4:26) Odie Armstrong 3-yard run (Fabrizio Scaccia kick), Arizona 35–12
- Arizona – (3:36) Marcus Tillman 7-yard net recovery (Fabrizio Scaccia kick), Arizona 42–12
- Utah – (0:33) Alvance Robinson 11-yard pass from Tommy Grady (Andrew Aguila kick), Arizona 42–19
- Arizona – (0:27) Virgil Gray 56-yard kickoff return (Fabrizio Scaccia kick failed), Arizona 48–19

3rd quarter

- Arizona – (11:57) Rod Windsor 8-yard pass from Trevor Harris (Fabrizio Scaccia kick), Arizona 55–19
- Arizona – (8:38) Fabrizio Scaccia 57-yard field goal, Arizona 58–19
- Utah – (6:13) Chris Bocage 4-yard pass from Tommy Grady (Tommy Grady pass failed), Arizona 58–25
- Arizona – (4:52) Odie Armstrong 19-yard run (Fabrizio Scaccia kick), Arizona 65–25
- Arizona – (0:10) Rod Windsor 9-yard pass from Trevor Harris (Fabrizio Scaccia kick), Arizona 72–25

4th quarter

- Utah – (10:30) Justin Ore 6-yard pass from Tommy Grady (Tommy Grady pass failed), Arizona 72–31
- Utah – (6:28) Ernest Pierce 42-yard pass from Jordan Rasmussen (Jordan Rasmussen rush failed), Arizona 72–37

Passing

- Arizona – Trevor Harris: 8/14, 87 yards, 2 TD
- Utah – Tommy Grady: 22/43, 156 yards, 4 TD, 1 INT

Rushing

- Arizona – Odie Armstrong: 7 att, 26 yards, 2 TD
- Utah – Ben Stallings: 1 att, 1 yard, 1 TD

Receiving

- Arizona – Rod Windsor: 10 rec, 98 yards, 4 TD
- Utah – Ernest Pierce: 14 rec, 128 yards, 2 TD

=== Week 14: vs. Iowa Barnstormers ===
Week 14: Iowa Barnstormers at Arizona Rattlers – Game summary

| Quarter | 1 | 2 | 3 | 4 | Total |
|---|---|---|---|---|---|
| Barnstormers | 6 | 14 | 14 | 7 | 41 |
| Rattlers | 21 | 14 | 13 | 13 | 61 |

at US Airways Center, Phoenix, Arizona

- Date: June 11
- Game time: 5:05 p.m. MST
- Game attendance: 8,664
- Referee: Chris Snead
- Recap

Game information

1st quarter

- Arizona – (8:00) Odie Armstrong 7-yard run (Fabrizio Scaccia kick), Arizona 7–0
- Iowa – (6:13) Jesse Schmidt 4-yard pass from Brad Banks (Nick Pertuit kick failed), Arizona 7–6
- Arizona – (5:21) Virgil Gray 54-yard kickoff return (Fabrizio Scaccia kick), Arizona 14–6
- Arizona – (2:09) Glen Fox 13-yard pass from Nick Davila (Fabrizio Scaccia kick), Arizona 21–6

2nd quarter

- Iowa – (11:06) Marquis Hamilton 3-yard pass from Brad Banks (Nick Pertuit kick), Arizona 21–13
- Arizona – (0:56) Rod Windsor 5-yard pass from Nick Davila (Fabrizio Scaccia kick), Arizona 28–13
- Iowa – (0:45) Marquis Hamilton 3-yard pass from Brad Banks (Nick Pertuit kick), Arizona 28–20
- Arizona – (0:09) Kerry Reed 9-yard pass from Nick Davila (Fabrizio Scaccia kick), Arizona 35–20

3rd quarter

- Arizona – (14:29) Odie Armstrong 15-yard pass from Nick Davila (Fabrizio Scaccia kick), Arizona 42–20
- Iowa – (8:30) Marquis Hamilton 7-yard pass from Bryan Lee-Lauduski (Nick Pertuit kick), Arizona 42–27
- Iowa – (2:42) Jesse Schmidt 3-yard pass from Bryan Lee-Lauduski (Nick Pertuit kick), Arizona 42–34
- Arizona – (0:00) Jason Geathers 8-yard pass from Nick Davila (Fabrizio Scaccia kick failed), Arizona 48–34

4th quarter

- Arizona – (12:35) Jason Geathers 14-yard pass from Nick Davila (Fabrizio Scaccia kick failed), Arizona 54–34
- Iowa – (10:45) Jesse Schmidt 41-yard pass from Bryan Lee-Lauduski (Nick Pertuit kick), Arizona 54–41
- Arizona – (7:47) Rod Windsor 13-yard pass from Nick Davila (Fabrizio Scaccia kick), Arizona 61–41

Passing

- Iowa – Bryan Lee-Lauduski: 17/27, 148 yards, 3 TD, 1 INT
- Arizona – Nick Davila: 20/28, 268 yards, 7 TD, 1 INT

Rushing

- Iowa – Brad Banks: 4 att, 19 yards
- Arizona – Odie Armstrong: 4 att, 21 yards, 1 TD

Receiving

- Iowa – Jesse Schmidt: 11 rec, 123 yards, 3 TD
- Arizona – Rod Windsor: 9 rec, 119 yards, 2 TD

=== Week 15: vs. San Jose SaberCats ===
Week 15: San Jose SaberCats at Arizona Rattlers – Game summary

| Quarter | 1 | 2 | 3 | 4 | Total |
|---|---|---|---|---|---|
| SaberCats | 7 | 28 | 14 | 8 | 57 |
| Rattlers | 14 | 21 | 7 | 22 | 64 |

at US Airways Center, Phoenix, Arizona

- Date: June 18
- Game time: 7:00 p.m. MST
- Game attendance: 9,397
- Referee: Shane Anderson
- Recap

Game information

1st quarter

- Arizona – (8:07) Kerry Reed 12-yard pass from Nick Davila (Fabrizio Scaccia kick), Arizona 7–0
- San Jose – (7:08) Chris Vedder 56-yard kickoff return (Juan Gamboa kick), Tied 7–7
- Arizona – (2:43) Jason Geathers 13-yard pass from Nick Davila (Fabrizio Scaccia kick), Arizona 14–7

2nd quarter

- San Jose – (10:47) James Roe 8-yard pass from Mark Grieb (Juan Gamboa kick), Tied 14–14
- Arizona – (9:58) Virgil Gray 58-yard kickoff return (Fabrizio Scaccia kick), Arizona 21–14
- San Jose – (6:02) Ben Nelson 24-yard pass from Mark Grieb (Juan Gamboa kick), Tied 21–21
- Arizona – (3:08) Jason Geathers 8-yard pass from Nick Davila (Fabrizio Scaccia kick), Arizona 28–21
- San Jose – (0:57) Ben Nelson 5-yard pass from Mark Grieb (Juan Gamboa kick), Tied 28–28
- Arizona – (0:38) Jason Geathers 5-yard pass from Nick Davila (Fabrizio Scaccia kick), Arizona 35–28
- San Jose – (0:20) Marco Thomas 3-yard pass from Mark Grieb (Juan Gamboa kick), Tied 35–35

3rd quarter

- San Jose – (11:01) Chad Cook 9-yard run (Juan Gamboa kick), San Jose 42–35
- San Jose – (1:29) James Roe 9-yard pass from Mark Grieb (Juan Gamboa kick), San Jose 49–35
- Arizona – (0:30) Virgil Gray 54-yard kickoff return (Fabrizio Scaccia kick), San Jose 49–42

4th quarter

- Arizona – (9:55) Kerry Reed 23-yard pass from Nick Davila (Fabrizio Scaccia kick), Tied 49–49
- Arizona – (1:52) Rod Windsor 6-yard pass from Nick Davila (Fabrizio Scaccia kick), Arizona 56–49
- San Jose – (0:23) Ben Nelson 26-yard pass from Mark Grieb (Mark Grieb pass), San Jose 57–56
- Arizona – (0:10) Jason Geathers 12-yard pass from Nick Davila (Nick Davila pass), Arizona 64–57

Passing

- San Jose – Mark Grieb: 26/40, 285 yards, 6 TD, 1 INT
- Arizona – Nick Davila: 22/33, 270 yards, 7 TD

Rushing

- San Jose – Chad Cook: 6 att, 21 yards, 1 TD
- Arizona – Odie Armstrong: 2 att, 9 yards

Receiving

- San Jose – Ben Nelson: 5 rec, 80 yards, 3 TD
- Arizona – Jason Geathers: 8 rec, 73 yards, 4 TD

=== Week 16: at Philadelphia Soul ===
Week 16: Arizona Rattlers at Philadelphia Soul – Game summary

| Quarter | 1 | 2 | 3 | 4 | Total |
|---|---|---|---|---|---|
| Rattlers | 7 | 20 | 7 | 21 | 55 |
| Soul | 14 | 20 | 13 | 7 | 54 |

at Wells Fargo Center, Philadelphia, Pennsylvania

- Date: June 25
- Game time: 4:05 p.m. MST
- Game attendance: 9,710
- Referee: Larry Smith
- Recap

Game information

1st quarter

- Arizona – (12:04) Rod Windsor 7-yard pass from Nick Davila (Fabrizio Scaccia kick), Arizona 7–0
- Philadelphia – (9:24) Donovan Morgan 33-yard pass from Ryan Vena (Jon Strictsky kick), Tied 7–7
- Philadelphia – (1:16) Ryan Vena 3-yard run (Jon Strictsky kick), Philadelphia 14–7

2nd quarter

- Arizona – (13:10) Jason Geathers 14-yard pass from Nick Davila (Fabrizio Scaccia kick failed), Philadelphia 14–13
- Philadelphia – (9:11) Larry Brackins 11-yard pass from Ryan Vena (Jon Strictsky kick), Philadelphia 21–13
- Philadelphia – (4:57) Ryan Vena 1-yard run (Jon Strictsky kick failed), Philadelphia 27–13
- Arizona – (0:56) Rod Windsor 4-yard pass from Nick Davila (Fabrizio Scaccia kick), Philadelphia 27–20
- Philadelphia – (0:45) Darnell Whitley 5-yard run (Jon Strictsky kick), Philadelphia 34–20
- Arizona – (0:05) Jason Geathers 4-yard pass from Nick Davila (Fabrizio Scaccia kick), Philadelphia 34–27

3rd quarter

- Philadelphia – (7:29) Darnell Whitley 4-yard run (Jon Strictsky kick), Philadelphia 41–27
- Arizona – (4:43) Jason Geathers 1-yard run (Fabrizio Scaccia kick), Philadelphia 41–34
- Philadelphia – (2:02) Ryan Vena 1-yard run (Jon Strictsky kick failed), Philadelphia 47–34

4th quarter

- Arizona – (11:09) Jason Geathers 2-yard pass from Nick Davila (Fabrizio Scaccia kick), Philadelphia 47–41
- Philadelphia – (6:23) Ryan Vena 7-yard run (Jon Strictsky kick), Philadelphia 54–41
- Arizona – (5:04) Rod Windsor 44-yard pass from Nick Davila (Fabrizio Scaccia kick), Philadelphia 54–48
- Arizona – (0:06) John Booker 1-yard pass from Nick Davila (Fabrizio Scaccia kick), Arizona 55–54

Passing

- Arizona – Nick Davila: 28/42, 320 yards, 7 TD, 2 INT
- Philadelphia – Ryan Vena: 18/32, 226 yards, 2 TD

Rushing

- Arizona – Jason Geathers: 3 att, 6 yards, 1 TD
- Philadelphia – Ryan Vena: 8 att, 18 yards, 4 TD

Receiving

- Arizona – Rod Windsor: 11 rec, 131 yards, 3 TD
- Philadelphia – Donovan Morgan: 5 rec, 98 yards, 1 TD

=== Week 17: vs. Spokane Shock ===
Week 17: Spokane Shock at Arizona Rattlers – Game summary

| Quarter | 1 | 2 | 3 | 4 | Total |
|---|---|---|---|---|---|
| Shock | 6 | 24 | 8 | 8 | 46 |
| Rattlers | 6 | 28 | 14 | 20 | 68 |

at US Airways Center, Phoenix, Arizona

- Date: July 2
- Game time: 7:05 p.m. MST
- Game attendance: 9,173
- Referee: Shawn Hochuli
- Recap

Game information

1st quarter

- Arizona – (8:15) Rod Windsor 3-yard pass from Nick Davila, Arizona 6–0
- Spokane – (4:25) Chas Gessner 17-yard pass from Erik Meyer, Tied 6–6

2nd quarter

- Arizona – (14:14) Odie Armstrong 3-yard pass from Nick Davila (Fabrizio Scaccia kick), Arizona 13–6
- Spokane – (11:19) Adron Tennell 27-yard pass from Erik Meyer (Taylor Rowan kick), Tied 13–13
- Arizona – (8:53) Rod Windsor 6-yard pass from Nick Davila (Fabrizio Scaccia kick), Arizona 20–13
- Spokane – (5:29) Erik Meyer 11-yard run (Taylor Rowan kick), Tied 20–20
- Arizona – (2:55) Jason Geathers 5-yard pass from Nick Davila (Fabrizio Scaccia kick), Arizona 27–20
- Spokane – (0:30) Adron Tennell 16-yard pass from Erik Meyer (Micah King kick), Tied 27–27
- Arizona – (0:18) Jason Geathers 14-yard pass from Nick Davila (Fabrizio Scaccia kick), Arizona 34–27
- Spokane – (0:00) Taylor Rowan 24-yard field goal, Arizona 34–30

3rd quarter

- Arizona – (9:29) Rod Windsor 13-yard pass from Nick Davila (Fabrizio Scaccia kick), Arizona 41–30
- Spokane – (5:28) Adron Tennell 11-yard pass from Erik Meyer (Erik Meyer pass), Arizona 41–38
- Arizona – (3:40) Jason Geathers 11-yard pass from Nick Davila (Fabrizio Scaccia kick), Arizona 48–38

4th quarter

- Arizona – (14:38) Odie Armstrong 6-yard run (Fabrizio Scaccia kick failed), Arizona 54–38
- Arizona – (10:06) Kerry Reed 25-yard pass from Nick Davila (Fabrizio Scaccia kick), Arizona 61–38
- Spokane – (6:15) Emery Sammons 16-yard pass from Kyle Rowley (Kyle Rowley rush), Arizona 61–46
- Arizona – (1:48) Rod Windsor 44-yard pass from Nick Davila (Fabrizio Scaccia kick), Arizona 68–46

Passing

- Spokane – Erik Meyer: 21/30, 243 yards, 4 TD, 1 INT
- Arizona – Nick Davila: 23/29, 291 yards, 9 TD

Rushing

- Spokane – Erik Meyer: 3 att, 13 yards, 1 TD
- Arizona – Odie Armstrong: 6 att, 23 yards, 1 TD

Receiving

- Spokane – Adron Tennell: 11 rec, 160 yards, 3 TD
- Arizona – Rod Windsor: 9 rec, 125 yards, 4 TD

=== Week 18: at Pittsburgh Power ===
Week 18: Arizona Rattlers at Pittsburgh Power – Game summary

| Quarter | 1 | 2 | 3 | 4 | Total |
|---|---|---|---|---|---|
| Rattlers | 21 | 13 | 13 | 21 | 68 |
| Power | 7 | 7 | 13 | 7 | 34 |

at Consol Energy Center, Pittsburgh, Pennsylvania

- Date: July 10
- Game time: 4:30 p.m. MST
- Game attendance: 8,600
- Referee: Jim Corpora
- Recap

Game information

1st quarter

- Arizona – (10:51) Kerry Reed 7-yard pass from Nick Davila (Fabrizio Scaccia kick), Arizona 7–0
- Arizona – (8:51) Rod Windsor 2-yard pass from Nick Davila (Fabrizio Scaccia kick), Arizona 14–0
- Pittsburgh – (3:39) Michael Washington 17-yard pass from Bernard Morris (Paul Edinger kick), Arizona 14–7
- Arizona – (0:04) Rod Windsor 6-yard pass from Nick Davila (Fabrizio Scaccia kick), Arizona 21–7

2nd quarter

- Pittsburgh – (10:38) Michael Washington 17-yard pass from Bernard Morris (Paul Edinger kick), Arizona 21–14
- Arizona – (5:48) Chris Jackson 5-yard pass from Nick Davila (Fabrizio Scaccia kick), Arizona 28–14
- Arizona – (0:09) Kerry Reed 3-yard pass from Nick Davila (Fabrizio Scaccia kick failed), Arizona 34–14

3rd quarter

- Arizona – (13:02) Chris Jackson 30-yard pass from Nick Davila (Fabrizio Scaccia kick), Arizona 41–14
- Pittsburgh – (11:19) Lonnell Dewalt 6-yard pass from Bernard Morris (Paul Edinger kick failed), Arizona 41–20
- Arizona – (4:53) Kerry Reed 15-yard pass from Nick Davila (Fabrizio Scaccia kick failed), Arizona 47–20
- Pittsburgh – (3:58) Michael Washington 57-yard kickoff return (Paul Edinger kick), Arizona 47–27

4th quarter

- Arizona – (13:14) Jason Geathers 2-yard pass from Nick Davila (Fabrizio Scaccia kick), Arizona 54–27
- Arizona – (8:01) Jason Geathers 5-yard pass from Trevor Harris (Fabrizio Scaccia kick), Arizona 61–27
- Pittsburgh – (5:52) Michael Washington 14-yard pass from Bernard Morris (Paul Edinger kick), Arizona 61–34
- Arizona – (3:35) Kerry Reed 6-yard pass from Trevor Harris (Fabrizio Scaccia kick), Arizona 68–34

Passing

- Arizona – Nick Davila: 22/35, 214 yards, 8 TD
- Pittsburgh – Bernard Morris: 19/35, 181 yards, 4 TD, 1 INT

Rushing

- Arizona – Odie Armstrong: 7 att, 22 yards
- Pittsburgh – Michael Washington: 2 att, 14 yards

Receiving

- Arizona – Jason Geathers: 8 rec, 86 yards, 2 TD
- Pittsburgh – Michael Washington: 6 rec, 63 yards, 3 TD

=== Week 20: at Dallas Vigilantes ===
Week 20: Arizona Rattlers at Dallas Vigilantes – Game summary

| Quarter | 1 | 2 | 3 | 4 | Total |
|---|---|---|---|---|---|
| Rattlers | 14 | 14 | 7 | 20 | 55 |
| Vigilantes | 0 | 21 | 14 | 14 | 49 |

at American Airlines Center, Dallas, Texas

- Date: July 23
- Game time: 5:30 p.m. MST
- Game attendance: 12,866
- Referee: David Cutaia
- Recap

Game information

1st quarter

- Arizona – (10:12) Chris Jackson 5-yard pass from Nick Davila (Jason Witczak kick), Arizona 7–0
- Arizona – (3:37) Chris Jackson 8-yard pass from Nick Davila (Jason Witczak kick), Arizona 14–0

2nd quarter

- Dallas – (10:43) Derrick Ross 1-yard run (Remy Hamilton kick), Arizona 14–7
- Dallas – (6:37) Derrick Ross 3-yard run (Remy Hamilton kick), Tied 14–14
- Arizona – (2:11) Kerry Reed 8-yard pass from Nick Davila (Jason Witczak kick), Arizona 21–14
- Dallas – (0:32) Derrick Ross 1-yard run (Remy Hamilton kick), Tied 21–21
- Arizona – (0:15) Chris Jackson 7-yard pass from Nick Davila (Jason Witczak kick), Arizona 28–21

3rd quarter

- Dallas – (10:50) R.J. Jackson 24-yard pass from Luke Drone (Remy Hamilton kick), Tied 28–28
- Arizona – (6:52) Chris Jackson 4-yard pass from Nick Davila (Jason Witczak kick), Arizona 35–28
- Dallas – (1:48) R.J. Jackson 4-yard pass from Luke Drone (Remy Hamilton kick), Tied 35–35

4th quarter

- Arizona – (11:52) Kerry Reed 5-yard pass from Nick Davila (Jason Witczak kick), Arizona 42–35
- Arizona – (5:33) Glen Fox 29-yard pass from Nick Davila (Jason Witczak kick), Arizona 49–35
- Dallas – (0:43) R.J. Jackson 2-yard pass from Luke Drone (Remy Hamilton kick), Arizona 49–42
- Arizona – (0:38) Chris Jackson 16-yard pass from Nick Davila (Jason Witczak kick failed), Arizona 55–42
- Dallas – (0:30) DeAndrew Rubin 46-yard kickoff return (Remy Hamilton kick), Arizona 55–49

Passing

- Arizona – Nick Davila: 26/35, 253 yards, 8 TD
- Dallas – Luke Drone: 17/27, 147 yards, 3 TD, 1 INT

Rushing

- Arizona – Nick Davila: 2 att, 17 yards
- Dallas – Derrick Ross: 9 att, 26 yards, 3 TD

Receiving

- Arizona – Chris Jackson: 7 rec, 71 yards, 5 TD
- Dallas – Anthony Jones: 10 rec, 133 yards

== Playoffs ==
=== National Conference Semifinals: vs. (4) Spokane Shock ===
National Conference Semifinals: Spokane Shock at Arizona Rattlers – Game summary

| Quarter | 1 | 2 | 3 | 4 | Total |
|---|---|---|---|---|---|
| (4) Shock | 7 | 6 | 7 | 13 | 33 |
| (1) Rattlers | 7 | 14 | 14 | 27 | 62 |

at US Airways Center, Phoenix, Arizona

- Date: July 29
- Game time: 7:00 p.m. MST
- Game attendance: 7,105
- Referee: Scott Vaughn
- Recap

Game information

1st quarter

- Spokane – (4:57) Randy Hymes 21-yard pass from Kyle Rowley (Taylor Rowan kick), Spokane 7–0
- Arizona – (4:02) Virgil Gray 54-yard kickoff return (Jason Witczak kick), Tied 7–7

2nd quarter

- Arizona – (5:35) Jason Geathers 6-yard pass from Nick Davila (Jason Witczak kick), Arizona 14–7
- Spokane – (2:08) Greg Orton 6-yard pass from Kyle Rowley (Taylor Rowan kick failed), Arizona 14–13
- Arizona – (0:08) Glen Fox 2-yard pass from Nick Davila (Jason Witczak kick), Arizona 21–13

3rd quarter

- Spokane – (7:59) Randy Hymes 18-yard pass from Kyle Rowley (Taylor Rowan kick), Arizona 21–20
- Arizona – (4:43) Kerry Reed 21-yard pass from Nick Davila (Jason Witczak kick), Arizona 28–20
- Arizona – (1:20) Odie Armstrong 5-yard run (Jason Witczak kick), Arizona 35–20

4th quarter

- Spokane – (13:09) Greg Orton 35-yard pass from Kyle Rowley (Taylor Rowan pass failed), Arizona 35–26
- Arizona – (10:45) Kerry Reed 6-yard pass from Nick Davila (Jason Witczak kick), Arizona 42–26
- Arizona – (7:52) Kevin McCullough 12-yard interception return (John Booker rush failed), Arizona 48–26
- Spokane – (4:16) Greg Orton 31-yard pass from Steve Sheffield (Taylor Rowan kick), Arizona 48–33
- Arizona – (2:29) Odie Armstrong 1-yard run (Jason Witczak kick), Arizona 55–33
- Arizona – (0:27) Marquis Floyd 40-yard interception return (Jason Witczak kick), Arizona 62–33

Passing

- Spokane – Kyle Rowley: 25/45, 210 yards, 4 TD, 3 INT
- Arizona – Nick Davila: 15/24, 167 yards, 4 TD, 2 INT

Rushing

- Spokane – Steve Sheffield: 1 att, 12 yards
- Arizona – Odie Armstrong: 5 att, 32 yards, 2 TD

Receiving

- Spokane – Randy Hymes: 12 rec, 110 yards, 2 TD
- Arizona – Kerry Reed: 6 rec, 80 yards, 2 TD

=== National Conference Championship: vs. (2) Chicago Rush ===
National Conference Championship: Chicago Rush at Arizona Rattlers – Game summary

| Quarter | 1 | 2 | 3 | 4 | Total |
|---|---|---|---|---|---|
| (2) Rush | 6 | 13 | 0 | 29 | 48 |
| (1) Rattlers | 14 | 14 | 13 | 13 | 54 |

at US Airways Center, Phoenix, Arizona

- Date: August 6
- Game time: 7:00 p.m. MST
- Game attendance: 6,886
- Referee: Alex Kemp
- Recap

Game information

1st quarter

- Arizona – (10:07) Chris Jackson 4-yard pass from Nick Davila (Jason Witczak kick), Arizona 7–0
- Chicago – (9:10) Jason Simpson 56-yard kickoff return (Chris Gould kick failed), Arizona 7–6
- Arizona – (5:23) Jason Geathers 14-yard pass from Nick Davila (Jason Witczak kick), Arizona 14–6

2nd quarter

- Chicago – (14:23) J.J. Raterink 1-yard run (Chris Gould rush failed), Arizona 14–12
- Arizona – (9:53) Jason Geathers 13-yard pass from Nick Davila (Jason Witczak kick), Arizona 21–12
- Chicago – (6:04) Reggie Gray 23-yard pass from J.J. Raterink (Chris Gould kick), Arizona 21–19
- Arizona – (0:36) Odie Armstrong 1-yard run (Jason Witczak kick), Arizona 28–19

3rd quarter

- Arizona – (8:31) Chris Jackson 11-yard pass from Nick Davila (Jason Witczak kick), Arizona 35–19
- Arizona – (5:18) Jason Geathers 7-yard pass from Nick Davila (Jason Witczak kick failed), Arizona 41–19

4th quarter

- Chicago – (13:15) Reggie Gray 30-yard pass from Dominic Randolph (Chris Gould kick), Arizona 41–26
- Chicago – (10:02) Marcus Waugh 4-yard run (J.J. Raterink pass), Arizona 41–34
- Arizona – (8:03) Jason Geathers 34-yard pass from Nick Davila (Jason Witczak kick), Arizona 48–34
- Chicago – (4:45) Reggie Gray 4-yard pass from J.J. Raterink (Chris Gould kick), Arizona 48–41
- Arizona – (3:10) Chris Jackson 5-yard pass from Nick Davila (Jason Witczak kick failed), Arizona 54–41
- Chicago – (0:06) Derek Lee 8-yard pass from J.J. Raterink (Chris Gould kick), Arizona 54–48

Passing

- Chicago – J.J. Raterink: 19/32, 187 yards, 3 TD, 2 INT
- Arizona – Nick Davila: 23/41, 283 yards, 7 TD, 1 INT

Rushing

- Chicago – Marcus Waugh: 1 att, 4 yards, 1 TD
- Arizona – Odie Armstrong: 4 att, 3 yards, 1 TD

Receiving

- Chicago – Reggie Gray: 7 rec, 101 yards, 3 TD
- Arizona – Jason Geathers: 10 rec, 150 yards, 4 TD

=== ArenaBowl XXIV: vs. (A1) Jacksonville Sharks ===
ArenaBowl XXIV: Jacksonville Sharks at Arizona Rattlers – Game summary

| Quarter | 1 | 2 | 3 | 4 | Total |
|---|---|---|---|---|---|
| (A1) Sharks | 12 | 20 | 6 | 35 | 73 |
| (N1) Rattlers | 14 | 21 | 7 | 28 | 70 |

at US Airways Center, Phoenix, Arizona

- Date: August 12
- Game time: 5:30 p.m. MST
- Game attendance: 14,320
- Referee: Shawn Hochuli
- Recap

Game information

1st quarter

- Arizona – (11:32) Odie Armstrong 2-yard run (Jason Witczak kick), Arizone 7–0
- Jacksonville – (10:23) Jomo Wilson 41-yard pass from Aaron Garcia (Marco Capozzoli kick failed), Arizona 7–6
- Arizona – (5:32) Kerry Reed 20-yard pass from Nick Davila (Jason Witczak kick), Arizona 14–6
- Jacksonville – (2:45) Jeron Harvey 11-yard pass from Aaron Garcia (Marco Capozzoli kick failed), Arizona 14–12

2nd quarter

- Jacksonville – (12:42) Jomo Wilson 0-yard fumble recovery (Marco Capozzoli kick), Jacksonville 19–14
- Arizona – (7:40) Chris Jackson 4-yard pass from Nick Davila (Jason Witczak kick), Arizona 21–19
- Jacksonville – (5:17) Jeff Hughley 31-yard pass from Aaron Garcia (Marco Capozzoli kick), Jacksonville 26–21
- Jacksonville – (2:54) Jamarko Simmons 1-yard run (Marco Capozzoli pass failed), Jacksonville 32–21
- Arizona – (0:55) Chris Jackson 18-yard pass from Nick Davila (Jason Witczak kick), Jacksonville 32–28
- Arizona – (0:12) Jason Geathers 16-yard pass from Nick Davila (Jason Witczak kick), Arizona 35–32

3rd quarter

- Arizona – (6:09) Odie Armstrong 9-yard pass from Nick Davila (Jason Witczak kick), Arizona 42–32
- Jacksonville – (1:56) Jamarko Simmons 3-yard pass from Aaron Garcia (Marco Capozzoli kick failed), Arizona 42–38

4th quarter

- Arizona – (13:21) Odie Armstrong 1-yard run (Jason Witczak kick), Arizona 49–38
- Jacksonville – (9:59) Jamarko Simmons 7-yard pass from Aaron Garcia (Marco Capozzoli kick), Arizona 49–45
- Jacksonville – (5:22) Kirby Griffin 4-yard run (Aaron Garcia pass), Jacksonville 53–49
- Arizona – (3:58) Jason Geathers 17-yard pass from Nick Davila (Jason Witczak kick), Arizona 56–53
- Jacksonville – (1:26) Jeron Harvey 45-yard pass from Aaron Garcia (Marco Capozzoli kick), Jacksonville 60–56
- Arizona – (0:52) Chris Jackson 5-yard pass from Nick Davila (Jason Witczak kick), Arizona 63–60
- Jacksonville – (0:40) Jomo Wilson 11-yard pass from Aaron Garcia (Marco Capozzoli kick), Jacksonville 67–63
- Arizona – (0:21) Kerry Reed 12-yard pass from Nick Davila (Jason Witczak kick), Arizona 70–67
- Jacksonville – (0:00) Jeron Harvey 10-yard pass from Aaron Garcia, Jacksonville 73–70

Passing

- Jacksonville – Aaron Garcia: 28/42, 402 yards, 8 TD
- Arizona – Nick Davila: 25/40, 338 yards, 8 TD, 1 INT

Rushing

- Jacksonville – Kirby Griffin: 7 att, 13 yards, 1 TD
- Arizona – Odie Armstrong: 3 att, 6 yards, 2 TD

Receiving

- Jacksonville – Jomo Wilson: 9 rec, 138 yards, 2 TD
- Arizona – Chris Jackson: 10 rec, 136 yards, 3 TD
