= Devin Clark =

Devin Clark may refer to:

- Devin Clark (fighter) (born 1990), American mixed martial artist
- Devin Clark (American football) (born 1986), American football offensive tackle
