= 2011 Tampa Bay Storm season =

Arena Football League team season

- Head coach: Dave Ewart
- Home stadium: St. Pete Times Forum

Results
- Record: 7–11
- Division place: 4th
- Playoffs: Did not qualify

The 2011 Tampa Bay Storm season is the 24th season for the franchise, their 20th in the Tampa Bay region. The team is coached by Dave Ewart and plays home games at the St. Pete Times Forum on the Amalie Motor Oil Field, sponsored by the Amalie Oil Company.

== Standings ==
South Division
Team	W	L	PCT	PF	PA	DIV	CON	Home	Away
z-Jacksonville Sharks	14	4	.778	1158	908	8–0	12–0	8–1	6–3
x-Georgia Force	11	7	.611	1007	931	7–5	5–3	5–4	6–3
x-Orlando Predators	11	7	.611	1001	933	4–4	8–4	6–3	5–4
Tampa Bay Storm	7	11	.389	802	993	2–6	4–8	4–5	3–6
New Orleans VooDoo	3	15	.167	826	1017	1–7	2–10	0–9	3–6

z - Clinched division and conference's best record
x - Clinched playoff berth

== Season schedule ==
=== Preseason ===
Day	Date	Kickoff	Opponent	Score	Location	Report
Monday	February 28	7:00 p.m. EST	at Jacksonville Sharks	L 19–56	Jacksonville Veterans Memorial Arena	
Thursday	March 3	7:30 p.m. EST	Orlando Predators	L 30–63	St. Pete Times Forum	

=== Regular season ===
The Storm began the season in New Orleans against the VooDoo on March 11. Their first home game was on March 27 as they hosted the Cleveland Gladiators. On July 23 they will host the San Jose SaberCats in their final regular season game.

Week	Day	Date	Kickoff	Opponent	Results		Location	Report
Week	Day	Date	Kickoff	Opponent	Score	Record	Location	Report
1	Friday	March 11	8:00 p.m. EST	at New Orleans VooDoo	W 46–40	1–0	New Orleans Arena	
2	Thursday	March 17	9:00 p.m. EDT	at Utah Blaze	L 36–72	1–1	EnergySolutions Arena	
3	Sunday	March 27	7:30 p.m. EDT	Cleveland Gladiators	L 26–66	1–2	St. Pete Times Forum	
4	Friday	April 1	8:00 p.m. EDT	Jacksonville Sharks	L 30–54	1–3	St. Pete Times Forum	
5	Bye							
6	Friday	April 15	8:00 p.m. EDT	at Philadelphia Soul	W 51–48	2–3	Wells Fargo Center	
7	Saturday	April 23	7:30 p.m. EDT	Dallas Vigilantes	L 61–67	2–4	St. Pete Times Forum	
8	Saturday	April 30	8:00 p.m. EDT	at Milwaukee Mustangs	L 33–50	2–5	Bradley Center	
9	Friday	May 6	8:00 p.m. EDT	at Orlando Predators	L 61–63	2–6	Amway Center	
10	Friday	May 13	7:30 p.m. EDT	Kansas City Command	W 46–30	3–6	St. Pete Times Forum	
11	Friday	May 20	11:00 p.m. EDT	at Spokane Shock	W 51–42	4–6	Spokane Veterans Memorial Arena	
12	Bye							
13	Saturday	June 4	7:35 p.m. EDT	at Georgia Force	L 49–60	4–7	Arena at Gwinnett Center	
14	Saturday	June 11	7:30 p.m. EDT	Pittsburgh Power	W 62–55	5–7	St. Pete Times Forum	
15	Friday	June 17	8:00 p.m. EDT	Orlando Predators	W 46–44	6–7	St. Pete Times Forum	
16	Saturday	June 25	7:00 p.m. EDT	at Jacksonville Sharks	L 41–66	6–8	Jacksonville Veterans Memorial Arena	
17	Friday	July 1	7:30 p.m. EDT	New Orleans VooDoo	L 33–64	6–9	St. Pete Times Forum	
18	Saturday	July 9	8:00 p.m. EDT	at Tulsa Talons	L 33–70	6–10	BOK Center	
19	Saturday	July 16	7:30 p.m. EDT	Georgia Force	L 40–58	6–11	St. Pete Times Forum	
20	Saturday	July 23	7:30 p.m. EDT	San Jose SaberCats	W 57–44	7–11	St. Pete Times Forum	

== Roster ==
2011 Tampa Bay Storm roster
Quarterbacks: 5 Matt Grothe; 18 Danny Southwick; 3 Brian Zbydniewski; Fullbacks: 12 Terrance Royal; Wide receivers: 4 Hank Edwards; 81 De'Cody Fagg; 11 Amarri Jackson; 10 Michael Lindsey	Offensive linemen: 77 Emmanuel Akah; 68 George Bussey; 23 Jorge Guerra; 75 Thomas Kaleita; 50 Ryan McDonald; 71 Ronnie Wilson; Defensive linemen: 6 Clifford Dukes; 33 Xzavie Jackson; 8 Tim McGill; 98 Jermaine Smith; 51 Greg Taplin	Linebackers: 51 Taylor Scott; 55 Eric Ortiz; Defensive backs: 9 Markihe Anderson; 21 Michael Hawthorne; 19 Erick McIntosh; 14 Colin Nelson; 15 Ray Polite; 28 Tavious Polo; Kickers: 1 Craig Camay	Injured Reserve: 16 Jarriett Buie DL; 2 Marcus Udell DB; Other League Exempt: 17 Huey Whittaker WR; Refused to Report: -- Billy Farris QB; Team Suspension: 33 Cedrick Fisher DL; 45 Michael Merritt FB; rookies in italics Roster updated July 22, 2011; 28 Active, 6 Inactive

== Regular season ==
=== Week 1: at New Orleans VooDoo ===
Week 1: Tampa Bay Storm at New Orleans VooDoo – Game summary

Quarter	1	2	3	4	Total
Storm	9	24	6	7	46
VooDoo	7	14	7	12	40

at New Orleans Arena, New Orleans, Louisiana

- Date: March 11
- Game time: 8:00 p.m. EST
- Referee: Scott Vaughn
- Recap

Game information

1st quarter

- Tampa Bay – (11:36) Team safety, Tampa Bay 2–0
- Tampa Bay – (6:41) Eric Ortiz 2-yard run (Kyle Chilton kick), Tampa Bay 9–0
- New Orleans – (1:59) Hutch Gonzalez 24-yard pass from Danny Wimprine (Jonathan Ruffin kick), Tampa Bay 9–7

2nd quarter

- Tampa Bay – (11:57) Grant Gregory 2-yard run (Kyle Chilton kick), Tampa Bay 16–7
- New Orleans – (9:00) Jason Schule 11-yard run (Jonathan Ruffin kick), Tampa Bay 16–14
- Tampa Bay – (4:55) Grant Gregory 1-yard run (Kyle Chilton kick), Tampa Bay 23–14
- Tampa Bay – (0:54) Kyle Chilton 29-yard field goal, Tampa Bay 26–14
- New Orleans – (0:46) P.J. Berry 57-yard kickoff return (Jonathan Ruffin kick), Tampa Bay 26–21
- Tampa Bay – (0:06) Michael Lindsey 3-yard run (Kyle Chilton kick), Tampa Bay 33–21

3rd quarter

- New Orleans – (2:54) P.J. Berry 10-yard pass from Danny Wimprine (Jonathan Ruffin kick), Tampa Bay 33–28
- Tampa Bay – (2:10) Michael Lindsey 57-yard kickoff return (Kyle Chilton kick failed), Tampa Bay 39–28

4th quarter

- New Orleans – (6:50) P.J. Berry 32-yard pass from Danny Wimprine (Danny Wimprine pass failed), Tampa Bay 39–34
- Tampa Bay – (0:56) Michael Lindsey 1-yard run (Kyle Chilton kick), Tampa Bay 46–34
- New Orleans – (0:00) P.J. Berry 1-yard run, Tampa Bay 46–40

Passing

- Tampa Bay – Mike Potts: 20/35, 165 yards
- New Orleans – Danny Wimprine: 20/29, 230 yards, 3 TD, 1 INT

Rushing

- Tampa Bay – Michael Lindsey: 3 att, 2 yards, 2 TD
- New Orleans – Jason Schule: 5 att, 32 yards, 1 TD

Receiving

- Tampa Bay – Huey Whittaker: 6 rec, 80 yards
- New Orleans – Hutch Gonzales: 9 rec, 108 yards, 1 TD

=== Week 2: at Utah Blaze ===
Week 2: Tampa Bay Storm at Utah Blaze – Game summary

Quarter	1	2	3	4	Total
Storm	10	13	7	6	36
Blaze	13	18	12	29	72

at EnergySolutions Arena, Salt Lake City, Utah

- Date: March 17
- Game time: 9:00 p.m. EDT
- Game attendance: 10,077
- Referee: Steve Strimling
- Recap

Game information

1st quarter

- Tampa Bay – (10:39) Kyle Chilton 30-yard field goal, Tampa Bay 3–0
- Utah – (7:47) Alvan Robinson 6-yard pass from Tommy Grady (John Wehrle kick failed), Utah 6–3
- Tampa Bay – (6:08) Hank Edwards 23-yard pass from Grant Gregory (Kyle Chilton kick), Tampa Bay 10–6
- Utah – (2:24) Aaron Boone 21-yard pass from Tommy Grady (John Wehrle kick), Utah 13–10

2nd quarter

- Tampa Bay – (14:18) Hank Edwards 23-yard pass from Grant Gregory (Kyle Chilton kick failed), Tampa Bay 16–13
- Utah – (11:24) Aaron Boone 13-yard pass from Tommy Grady (John Wehrle kick failed), Utah 19–16
- Tampa Bay – (7:05) Michael Lindsey 10-yard pass from Grant Gregory (Kyle Chilton kick), Tampa Bay 23–19
- Utah – (4:59) Ben Stallings 6-yard run (John Wehrle kick failed), Utah 25–23
- Utah – (0:07) Ernie Pierce 15-yard pass from Tommy Grady (John Wehrle kick failed), Utah 31–23

3rd quarter

- Utah – (8:43) Alvan Robinson 26-yard pass from Tommy Grady (Tommy Grady pass failed), Utah 37–23
- Utah – (3:09) Aaron Lesue 33-yard pass from Tommy Grady (Tommy Grady pass failed), Utah 43–23
- Tampa Bay – (1:10) Huey Whittaker 31-yard pass from Grant Gregory (Kyle Chilton kick), Utah 43–30

4th quarter

- Utah – (13:38) Ben Stallings 4-yard run (Alvan Robinson pass), Utah 51–30
- Utah – (8:45) Tommy Grady 1-yard run (John Wehrle kick), Utah 58–30
- Utah – (3:58) Tommy Grady 1-yard run (John Wehrle kick), Utah 65–30
- Utah – (1:08) Jason Boone 1-yard pass from Tommy Grady (John Wehrle kick), Utah 72–30
- Tampa Bay – (0:48) Hank Edwards 33-yard pass from Mike Potts (Kyle Chilton kick failed), Utah 72–36

Passing

- Tampa Bay – Grant Gregory: 16/29, 186 yards, 4 TD, 2 INT
- Utah – Tommy Grady: 26/39, 306 yards, 7 TD

Rushing

- Tampa Bay – Grant Gregory: 2 att, 14 yards
- Utah – Ben Stallings: 6 att, 36 yards, 2 TD

Receiving

- Tampa Bay – Hank Edwards: 7 rec, 110 yards, 3 TD
- Utah – Aaron Boone: 11 rec, 135 yards, 2 TD

=== Week 3: vs. Cleveland Gladiators ===
Week 3: Cleveland Gladiators at Tampa Bay Storm – Game summary

Quarter	1	2	3	4	Total
Gladiators	22	10	13	21	66
Storm	0	13	6	7	26

at St. Pete Times Forum, Tampa, Florida

- Date: March 27
- Game time: 7:30 p.m. EDT
- Game attendance: 7,939
- Referee: Kevin Stine
- Recap

Game information

1st quarter

- Cleveland – (14:31) Team safety, Cleveland 2–0
- Cleveland – (13:01) Robert Redd 32-yard pass from Kurt Rocco (Matt Denny kick failed), Cleveland 8–0
- Cleveland – (7:37) Russell Monk 1-yard run (Matt Denny kick), Cleveland 15–0
- Cleveland – (4:00) Troy Bergeron 21-yard pass from Kurt Rocco (Matt Denny kick), Cleveland 22–0

2nd quarter

- Cleveland – (8:21) Matt Denny 22-yard field goal, Cleveland 25–0
- Tampa Bay – (8:09) Michael Lindsey 56-yard kickoff return (Kyle Chilton kick), Cleveland 25–7
- Cleveland – (0:44) Mike Bragg 32-yard interception return (Matt Denny kick), Cleveland 32–7
- Tampa Bay – (0:13) Hank Edwards 4-yard pass from Mike Potts (Kyle Chilton kick failed), Cleveland 32–13

3rd quarter

- Cleveland – (12:30) Troy Bergeron 21-yard pass from Kurt Rocco (Matt Denny kick), Cleveland 39–13
- Cleveland – (1:16) Victor Williams 25-yard pass from Kurt Rocco (Matt Denny kick failed), Cleveland 45–13
- Tampa Bay – (0:22) Michael Lindsey 58-yard kickoff return (Kyle Chilton kick failed), Cleveland 45–19

4th quarter

- Cleveland – (14:55) Troy Bergeron 6-yard pass from Kurt Rocco (Matt Denny kick), Cleveland 52–19
- Cleveland – (9:30) Robert Redd 43-yard pass from Kurt Rocco (Matt Denny kick), Cleveland 59–19
- Cleveland – (7:01) Kurt Rocco 1-yard run (Matt Denny kick), Cleveland 66–19
- Tampa Bay – (2:26) Huey Whittaker 13-yard pass from Grant Gregory (Kyle Chilton kick), Cleveland 66–26

Passing

- Cleveland – Kurt Rocco: 20/23, 270 yards, 6 TD
- Tampa Bay – Mike Potts: 16/30, 139 yards, 1 TD, 3 INT

Rushing

- Cleveland – Kurt Rocco: 6 att, 7 yards, 1 TD
- Tampa Bay – Grant Gregory: 2 att, 21 yards

Receiving

- Cleveland – Robert Redd: 7 rec, 112 yards, 2 TD
- Tampa Bay – Huey Whittaker: 10 rec, 103 yards, 1 TD

=== Week 4: vs. Jacksonville Sharks ===
Week 4: Jacksonville Sharks at Tampa Bay Storm – Game summary

Quarter	1	2	3	4	Total
Sharks	6	20	21	7	54
Storm	14	10	6	0	30

at St. Pete Times Forum, Tampa, Florida

- Date: April 1
- Game time: 8:00 p.m. EDT
- Game attendance: 10,304
- Referee: Perry Havener
- Recap

Game information

1st quarter

- Tampa Bay – (11:28) Huey Whittaker 4-yard pass from Grant Gregory (Kyle Chilton kick), Tampa Bay 7–0
- Tampa Bay – (6:17) Amari Jackson 9-yard pass from Grant Gregory (Kyle Chilton kick), Tampa Bay 14–0
- Jacksonville – (4:19) Sale' Key 5-yard pass from Aaron Garcia (Marco Capozzoli kick failed), Tampa Bay 14–6

2nd quarter

- Tampa Bay – (14:56) Huey Whittaker 7-yard pass from Grant Gregory (Kyle Chilton kick), Tampa Bay 21–6
- Jacksonville – (12:34) Kirby Griffin 4-yard run (Marco Capozzoli kick), Tampa Bay 21–13
- Tampa Bay – (8:38) Kyle Chilton 49-yard field goal, Tampa Bay 24–13
- Jacksonville – (5:44) Jeff Hughley 9-yard pass from Aaron Garcia (Marco Capozzoli kick), Tampa Bay 24–20
- Jacksonville – (0:11) Jomo Wilson 12-yard pass from Aaron Garcia (Marco Capozzoli kick failed), Jacksonville 26–24

3rd quarter

- Jacksonville – (9:08) Jeff Hughley 4-yard pass from Aaron Garcia (Marco Capozzoli kick), Jacksonville 33–24
- Tampa Bay – (5:31) Hank Edwards 20-yard pass from Grant Gregory (Kyle Chilton kick failed), Jacksonville 33–30
- Jacksonville – (2:48) Sale' Key 7-yard pass from Aaron Garcia (Marco Capozzoli kick), Jacksonville 40–30
- Jacksonville – (0:08) Kirby Griffin 8-yard run (Marco Capozzoli kick), Jacksonville 47–30

4th quarter

- Jacksonville – (8:57) Jomo Wilson 25-yard pass from Aaron Garcia (Marco Capozzoli kick), Jacksonville 54–30

Passing

- Jacksonville – Aaron Garcia: 21/27, 238 yards, 6 TD, 1 INT
- Tampa Bay – Grant Gregory: 27/42, 285 yards, 4 TD

Rushing

- Jacksonville – Kirby Griffin: 4 att, 33 yards, 2 TD
- Tampa Bay – Grant Gregory: 4 att, 12 yards

Receiving

- Jacksonville – Jomo Wilson: 7 rec, 111 yards, 2 TD
- Tampa Bay – Huey Whittaker: 8 rec, 85 yards, 2 TD

=== Week 6: at Philadelphia Soul ===
Week 6: Tampa Bay Storm at Philadelphia Soul – Game summary

Quarter	1	2	3	4	Total
Storm	13	13	0	25	51
Soul	14	14	13	7	48

at Wells Fargo Center, Philadelphia

- Date: April 15
- Game time: 8:00 p.m. EDT
- Game attendance: 12,893
- Referee: Kevin Stein
- Recap

Game information

1st quarter

- Philadelphia – (10:16) Ryan Vena 9-yard run (Massimo Scaccia kick), Philadelphia 7–0
- Tampa Bay – (5:58) Hank Edwards 3-yard pass from Grant Gregory (Kyle Chilton kick), Tied 7–7
- Philadelphia – (4:47) Donovan Morgan 37-yard pass from Ryan Vena (Massimo Scaccia kick), Philadelphia 14–7
- Tampa Bay – (2:18) Hank Edwards 6-yard pass from Grant Gregory (Kyle Chilton kick failed), Philadelphia 14–13

2nd quarter

- Philadelphia – (12:46) Ryan Vena 1-yard run (Massimo Scaccia kick), Philadelphia 21–13
- Tampa Bay – (1:33) Huey Whittaker 9-yard pass from Grant Gregory (Kyle Chilton kick), Philadelphia 21–20
- Philadelphia – (0:57) Tanner Varner 12-yard kickoff return (Massimo Scaccia kick), Philadelphia 28–20
- Tampa Bay – (0:16) Amarri Jackson 4-yard pass from Grant Gregory (Kyle Chilton kick blocked), Philadelphia 28–26

3rd quarter

- Philadelphia – (12:45) Syvelle Newton 16-yard pass from Ryan Vena (Massimo Scaccia kick), Philadelphia 35–26
- Philadelphia – (0:56) Donovan Morgan 11-yard pass from Ryan Vena (Massimo Scaccia kick failed), Philadelphia 41–26

4th quarter

- Tampa Bay – (13:32) Eric Ortiz 1-yard run (Grant Gregory pass), Philadelphia 41–34
- Tampa Bay – (8:35) Hank Edwards 4-yard pass from Grant Gregory (Kyle Chilton kick), Tied 41–41
- Tampa Bay – (2:43) Hank Edwards 4-yard pass from Grant Gregory (Kyle Chilton kick), Tampa Bay 48–41
- Philadelphia – (0:46) Syvelle Newton 33-yard pass from Ryan Vena (Massimo Scaccia kick), Tied 48–48
- Tampa Bay – (0:00) Kyle Chilton 30-yard field goal, Tampa Bay 51–48

Passing

- Tampa Bay – Grant Gregory: 23/29, 211 yards, 6 TD, 2 INT
- Philadelphia – Ryan Vena: 18/33, 225 yards, 4 TD, 1 INT

Rushing

- Tampa Bay – Grant Gregory: 2 att, 12 yards
- Philadelphia – Ryan Vena: 4 att, 15 yards, 2 TD

Receiving

- Tampa Bay – Hank Edwards: 10 rec, 74 yards, 4 TD
- Philadelphia – Syvelle Newton: 7 rec, 105 yards, 2 TD

=== Week 7: vs. Dallas Vigilantes ===
Week 7: Dallas Vigilantes at Tampa Bay Storm – Game summary

Quarter	1	2	3	4	Total
Vigilantes	12	21	20	14	67
Storm	20	7	7	27	61

at St. Pete Times Forum, Tampa, Florida

- Date: April 23
- Game time: 7:30 p.m. EDT
- Game attendance: 12,226
- Referee: Kevin Stein
- Recap

Game information

1st quarter

- Tampa Bay – (11:52) Huey Whittaker 6-yard pass from Grant Gregory (Kyle Chilton kick), Tampa Bay 7–0
- Tampa Bay – (7:28) Huey Whittaker 40-yard pass from Grant Gregory (Kyle Chilton kick failed), Tampa Bay 13–0
- Dallas – (5:41) Anthony Jones 15-yard pass from Dan Raudabaugh (Remy Hamilton kick failed), Tampa Bay 13–6
- Tampa Bay – (3:45) Amari Jackson 14-yard pass from Grant Gregory (Kyle Chilton kick), Tampa Bay 20–6
- Dallas – (1:09) Matt Fields 5-yard run (Remy Hamilton rush fumbled), Tampa Bay 20–12

2nd quarter

- Tampa Bay – (9:11) Eric Ortiz 1-yard run (Kyle Chilton kick), Tampa Bay 27–12
- Dallas – (4:33) Derrick Ross 2-yard run (Remy Hamilton kick), Tampa Bay 27–19
- Dallas – (1:28) Justin Warren 15-yard interception return (Remy Hamilton kick), Tampa Bay 27–26
- Dallas – (0:00) Greg Ryan 0-yard net recovery (Remy Hamilton kick), Dallas 33–27

3rd quarter

- Tampa Bay – (13:00) Huey Whittaker 4-yard pass from Grant Gregory (Kyle Chilton kick), Tampa Bay 34–33
- Dallas – (11:13) Matt Fields 37-yard pass from Dan Raudabaugh (Remy Hamilton kick), Dallas 40–34
- Dallas – (4:42) Anthony Jones 9-yard pass from Dan Raudabaugh (Remy Hamilton kick failed), Dallas 46–34
- Dallas – (4:02) James Bear 0-yard net recovery (Remy Hamilton kick), Dallas 53–34

4th quarter

- Tampa Bay – (14:13) Huey Whittaker 5-yard pass from Grant Gregory (Kyle Chilton kick), Dallas 53–41
- Dallas – (12:33) Matt Fields 4-yard run (Remy Hamilton kick), Dallas 60–41
- Dallas – (5:25) Matt Fields 41-yard pass from Dan Raudabaugh (Remy Hamilton kick), Dallas 67–41
- Tampa Bay – (2:46) Huey Whittaker 9-yard pass from Brian Zbydniewski (Kyle Chilton kick failed), Dallas 67–47
- Tampa Bay – (0:12) Hank Edwards 7-yard pass from Brian Zbydniewski (Brian Zbydniewski pass), Dallas 67–55
- Tampa Bay – (0:00) Michael Lindsey 33-yard pass from Brian Zbydniewski, Dallas 67–61

Passing

- Dallas – Dan Raudabaugh: 13/20, 202 yards, 4 TD
- Tampa Bay – Grant Gregory: 24/42, 275 yards, 5 TD, 3 INT

Rushing

- Dallas – Derrick Ross: 12 att, 39 yards, 1 TD
- Tampa Bay – Eric Ortiz: 1 att, 1 yard, 1 TD

Receiving

- Dallas – Matt Fields: 5 rec, 116 yards, 2 TD
- Tampa Bay – Huey Whittaker: 15 rec, 193 yards, 5 TD

=== Week 8: at Milwaukee Mustangs ===
Week 8: Tampa Bay Storm at Milwaukee Mustangs – Game summary

Quarter	1	2	3	4	Total
Storm	14	0	13	6	33
Mustangs	7	23	10	10	50

at Bradley Center, Milwaukee, Wisconsin

- Date: April 30
- Game time: 8:00 p.m. EDT
- Game attendance: 4,012
- Recap

Game information

1st quarter

- Milwaukee – (11:28) Mykel Benson 1-yard run (Garrett Lindholm kick), Milwaukee 7–0
- Tampa Bay – (9:10) Hank Edwards 28-yard pass from Brian Zbydniewski (Kyle Chilton kick), Tied 7–7
- Tampa Bay – (5:39) Amari Jackson 21-yard pass from Brian Zbydniewski (Kyle Chilton kick), Tampa Bay 14–7

2nd quarter

- Milwaukee – (14:14) Garrett Lindholm 21-yard field goal, Tampa Bay 14–10
- Milwaukee – (13:19) Marcus Everett 4-yard interception return (Garrett Lindholm kick blocked), Milwaukee 16–14
- Milwaukee – (11:47) Kelvin Rogers 10-yard interception return (Garrett Lindholm kick), Milwaukee 23–14
- Milwaukee – (8:12) Justin Lawrence 3-yard run (Garrett Lindholm kick), Milwaukee 30–14

3rd quarter

- Milwaukee – (10:15) Damian Harrell 4-yard pass from R.J. Archer (Garrett Lindholm kick), Milwaukee 37–14
- Tampa Bay – (5:43) Huey Whittaker 4-yard pass from Brian Zbydniewski (Kyle Chilton kick failed), Milwaukee 37–20
- Milwaukee – (2:51) Garrett Lindholm 23-yard field goal, Milwaukee 40–20
- Tampa Bay – (2:14) Huey Whittaker 41-yard pass from Brian Zbydniewski (Kyle Chilton kick), Milwaukee 40–27

4th quarter

- Milwaukee – (14:29) R.J. Archer 1-yard run (Garrett Lindholm kick), Milwaukee 47–27
- Milwaukee – (5:00) Garrett Lindholm 18-yard field goal, Milwaukee 50–27
- Tampa Bay – (2:47) Terrence Royal 1-yard run (Brian Zbydniewski rush failed), Milwaukee 50–33

Passing

- Tampa Bay – Brian Zbydniewski: 17/29, 270 yards, 4 TD, 3 INT
- Milwaukee – R.J. Archer: 16/23, 150 yards, 1 TD

Rushing

- Tampa Bay – Terrence Royal: 3 att, 3 yards, 1 TD
- Milwaukee – Mykel Benson: 5 att, 10 yards, 1 TD

Receiving

- Tampa Bay – Huey Whittaker: 8 rec, 113 yards, 2 TD
- Milwaukee – Ernest Smith: 6 rec, 82 yards

=== Week 9: at Orlando Predators ===
Week 9: Tampa Bay Storm at Orlando Predators – Game summary

Quarter	1	2	3	4	Total
Storm	14	7	14	26	61
Predators	14	21	6	22	63

at Amway Center, Orlando, Florida

- Date: May 6
- Game time: 8:00 p.m. EDT
- Game attendance: 12,897
- Referee: Scott Vaughn
- Recap

Game information

1st quarter

- Tampa Bay – (12:35) Michael Lindsey 2-yard run (Kyle Chilton kick), Tampa Bay 7–0
- Orlando – (10:41) T.T. Toliver 27-yard pass from Nick Hill (Mark Lewis kick), Tied 7–7
- Orlando – (6:59) Bobby Sippio 2-yard pass from Nick Hill (Mark Lewis kick), Orlando 14–7
- Tampa Bay – (1:34) Terrence Royal 1-yard run (Kyle Chilton kick), Tied 14–14

2nd quarter

- Orlando – (13:14) T.T. Toliver 15-yard pass from Nick Hill (Mark Lewis kick), Orlando 21–14
- Orlando – (6:40) Robert Quiroga 5-yard pass from Nick Hill (Mark Lewis kick), Orlando 28–14
- Tampa Bay – (2:37) Terrence Royal 1-yard run (Kyle Chilton kick), Orlando 28–21
- Orlando – (0:07) Nick Hill 7-yard run (Mark Lewis kick), Orlando 35–21

3rd quarter

- Tampa Bay – (9:44) Huey Whittaker 4-yard pass from Brian Zbydniewski (Kyle Chilton kick), Orlando 35–28
- Tampa Bay – (8:15) Huey Whittaker 0-yard net recovery (Kyle Chilton kick), Tied 35–35
- Orlando – (7:47) T.T. Toliver 39-yard pass from Nick Hill (Mark Lewis kick failed), Orlando 41–35

4th quarter

- Orlando – (13:31) Josh Bush 9-yard pass from Nick Hill (Nick Hill pass), Orlando 49–35
- Tampa Bay – (12:09) Amari Jackson 10-yard pass from Brian Zbydniewski (Kyle Chilton kick), Orlando 49–42
- Orlando – (7:06) Josh Bush 6-yard pass from Nick Hill (Mark Lewis kick), Orlando 56–42
- Tampa Bay – (6:08) Amari Jackson 10-yard fumble recovery (Kyle Chilton kick failed), Orlando 56–48
- Orlando – (4:05) Bobby Sippio 26-yard pass from Nick Hill (Mark Lewis kick), Orlando 63–48
- Tampa Bay – (2:47) Amari Jackson 32-yard pass from Brian Zbydniewski (Brian Zbydniewski pass failed), Orlando 63–54
- Tampa Bay – (0:12) Huey Whittaker 9-yard pass from Brian Zbydniewski (Kyle Chilton kick), Orlando 63–61

Passing

- Tampa Bay – Brian Zbydniewski: 26/39, 304 yards, 4 TD, 3 INT
- Orlando – Nick Hill: 24/37, 323 yards, 8 TD, 1 INT

Rushing

- Tampa Bay – Terrence Royal: 3 att, 6 yards, 2 TD
- Orlando – Nick Hill: 5 att, 26 yards, 1 TD

Receiving

- Tampa Bay – Amari Jackson: 10 rec, 146 yards, 2 TD
- Orlando – T.T. Toliver: 9 rec, 140 yards, 3 TD

=== Week 10: vs. Kansas City Command ===
Week 10: Kansas City Command at Tampa Bay Storm – Game summary

Quarter	1	2	3	4	Total
Command	3	13	7	7	30
Storm	14	13	6	13	46

at St. Pete Times Forum, Tampa, Florida

- Date: May 13
- Game time: 7:30 p.m. EDT
- Game attendance: 11,172
- Referee: Alex Kemp
- Recap

Game information

1st quarter

- Tampa Bay – (12:45) Amari Jackson 29-yard pass from Brian Zbydniewski (Kyle Chilton kick), Tampa Bay 7–0
- Kansas City – (7:15) Brian Umstead 21-yard field goal, Tampa Bay 7–3
- Tampa Bay – (1:59) Terrence Royal 2-yard run (Kyle Chilton kick), Tampa Bay 14–3

2nd quarter

- Tampa Bay – (5:32) Huey Whittaker 7-yard pass from Brian Zbydniewski (Kyle Chilton kick failed), Tampa Bay 20–3
- Kansas City – (4:19) Robert Gill 40-yard pass from J.J. Raterink (Brian Umstead kick), Tampa Bay 20–10
- Tampa Bay – (0:49) Huey Whittaker 2-yard pass from Brian Zbydniewski (Kyle Chilton kick), Tampa Bay 27–10
- Kansas City – (0:11) Bret Smith 19-yard pass from J.J. Raterink (Brian Umstead kick failed), Tampa Bay 27–16

3rd quarter

- Kansas City – (12:56) Aaron Hosack 5-yard pass from J.J. Raterink (Brian Umstead kick), Tampa Bay 27–23
- Tampa Bay – (2:41) Amari Jackson 9-yard pass from Brian Zbydniewski (Kyle Chilton kick failed), Tampa Bay 33–23

4th quarter

- Tampa Bay – (10:19) Amari Jackson 5-yard pass from Brian Zbydniewski (Kyle Chilton kick failed), Tampa Bay 39–23
- Tampa Bay – (1:44) Amari Jackson 35-yard pass from Brian Zbydniewski (Kyle Chilton kick), Tampa Bay 46–23
- Kansas City – (0:06) Aaron Hosack 4-yard pass from J.J. Raterink (Brian Umstead kick), Tampa Bay 46–30

Passing

- Kansas City – J.J. Raterink: 21/35, 289 yards, 4 TD, 1 INT
- Tampa Bay – Brian Zbydniewski: 26/44, 277 yards, 6 TD

Rushing

- Kansas City – J.J. Raterink: 3 att, 7 yards
- Tampa Bay – Terrance Royal: 4 att, 17 yards, 1 TD

Receiving

- Kansas City – Robert Gill: 7 rec, 159 yards, 1 TD
- Tampa Bay – Amari Jackson: 14 rec, 187 yards, 4 TD

=== Week 11: at Spokane Shock ===
Week 11: Tampa Bay Storm at Spokane Shock – Game summary

Quarter	1	2	3	4	Total
Storm	7	24	0	20	51
Shock	13	9	0	20	42

at Spokane Veterans Memorial Arena, Spokane, Washington

- Date: May 20
- Game time: 11:00 p.m. EDT
- Game attendance: 9,320
- Referee: Dave Cutaia
- Recap

Game information

1st quarter

- Tampa Bay – (13:26) Amari Jackson 6-yard pass from Brian Zbydniewski (Kyle Chilton kick), Tampa Bay 7–0
- Spokane – (12:30) Ruschard Dodd-Masters 55-yard kickoff return (Taylor Rowan kick blocked), Tampa Bay 7–6
- Spokane – (5:35) Raul Vijil 2-yard pass from Casey Hansen (Taylor Rowan kick), Spokane 13–7

2nd quarter

- Tampa Bay – (12:52) Kyle Chilton 17-yard field goal, Spokane 13–10
- Spokane – (11:22) Greg Orton 27-yard pass from Casey Hansen (Taylor Rowan kick failed), Spokane 20–10
- Tampa Bay – (7:17) Huey Whittaker 20-yard pass from Brian Zbydniewski (Kyle Chilton kick), Spokane 19–17
- Tampa Bay – (3:05) Amari Jackson 11-yard pass from Brian Zbydniewski (Kyle Chilton kick), Tampa Bay 24–19
- Tampa Bay – (0:39) Huey Whittaker 24v pass from Brian Zbydniewski (Kyle Chilton kick), Tampa Bay 31–19
- Spokane – (0:00) Taylor Rowan 44-yard field goal, Tampa Bay 31–22

3rd quarter

No scoring

4th quarter

- Spokane – (9:48) Emery Sammons 1-yard run (Taylor Rowan kick blocked), Tampa Bay 31–28
- Tampa Bay – (5:57) Huey Whittaker 12-yard pass from Brian Zbydniewski (Kyle Chilton kick), Tampa Bay 38–28
- Spokane – (3:08) Raul Vijil 4-yard pass from Casey Hansen (Taylor Rowan kick blocked), Tampa Bay 38–34
- Tampa Bay – (1:09) Amari Jackson 10-yard pass from Brian Zbydniewski (Kyle Chilton kick failed), Tampa Bay 44–34
- Tampa Bay – (0:45) Michael Hawthorne 17-yard interception return (Kyle Chilton kick), Tampa Bay 51–34
- Spokane – (0:21) Greg Orton 16-yard pass from Casey Hansen (Casey Hansen pass), Tampa Bay 51–42

Passing

- Tampa Bay – Brian Zbydniewski: 23/33, 233 yards, 6 TD, 1 INT
- Spokane – Casey Hansen: 25/43, 288 yards, 4 TD, 1 INT

Rushing

- Tampa Bay – Terrence Royal: 8 att, 15 yards
- Spokane – Emery Sammons: 1 att, 1 yard, 1 TD

Receiving

- Tampa Bay – Huey Whittaker: 11 rec, 123 yards, 3 TD
- Spokane – Raul Vijil: 14 rec, 146 yards, 2 TD

=== Week 13: at Georgia Force ===
Week 13: Tampa Bay Storm at Georgia Force – Game summary

Quarter	1	2	3	4	Total
Storm	3	7	19	20	49
Force	7	18	14	21	60

at Arena at Gwinnett Center, Duluth, Georgia

- Date: June 4
- Game time: 7:35 p.m. EDT
- Game attendance: 4,023
- Referee: Scott Vaughn
- Recap

Game information

1st quarter

- Georgia – (7:26) Larry Shipp 30-yard pass from Brett Elliott (Carlos Martinez kick), Georgia 7–0
- Tampa Bay – (0:30) Kyle Chilton 43-yard field goal, Georgia 7–3

2nd quarter

- Georgia – (9:27) Maurice Purify 9-yard pass from Brett Elliott, Georgia 13–3
- Tampa Bay – (5:04) Amarri Jackson 7-yard pass from Brian Zbydniewski (Kyle Chilton kick), Georgia 13–10
- Georgia – (0:56) Mike Johnson 2-yard pass from Brett Elliott (Carlos Martinez kick), Georgia 20–10
- Georgia – (0:54) Team safety, Georgia 22–10
- Georgia – (0:00) Carlos Martinez 26-yard field goal, Georgia 25–10

3rd quarter

- Tampa Bay – (9:38) Huey Whittaker 3-yard pass from Brian Zbydniewski (Kyle Chilton kick), Georgia 25–17
- Georgia – (7:40) Maurice Purify 35-yard pass from Brett Elliott (Carlos Martinez kick), Georgia 32–17
- Tampa Bay – (6:18) Hank Edwards 47-yard pass from Brian Zbydniewski (Kyle Chilton rush fumbled), Georgia 32–23
- Georgia – (4:18) Maurice Purify 13-yard pass from Brett Elliott (Carlos Martinez kick), Georgia 39–23
- Tampa Bay – (2:25) Huey Whittaker 6-yard pass from Brian Zbydniewski (Kyle Chilton kick failed), Georgia 39–29

4th quarter

- Georgia – (14:57) Maurice Purify 14-yard pass from Brett Elliott (Carlos Martinez kick), Georgia 46–29
- Tampa Bay – (10:30) Michael Hawthorne 21-yard interception return (Kyle Chilton kick), Georgia 46–36
- Georgia – (8:35) Maurice Purify 6-yard pass from Brett Elliott (Carlos Martinez kick), Georgia 53–36
- Tampa Bay – (5:21) Hank Edwards 19-yard pass from Brian Zbydniewski (Kyle Chilton kick), Georgia 53–43
- Georgia – (2:47) Ben McDowell 1-yard run (Carlos Martinez kick), Georgia 60–43
- Tampa Bay – (0:14) Michael Lindsey 15-yard pass from Brian Zbydniewski, Georgia 60–49

Passing

- Tampa Bay – Brian Zbydniewski: 22/41, 314 yards, 6 TD
- Georgia – Brett Elliott: 22/32, 248 yards, 7 TD, 1 INT

Rushing

- Tampa Bay – Terrence Royal: 1 att, 3 yards
- Georgia – Brett Elliott: 1 att, 15 yards

Receiving

- Tampa Bay – Hank Edwards: 6 rec, 142 yards, 2 TD
- Georgia – Maurice Purify: 8 rec, 120 yards, 5 TD

=== Week 14: vs. Pittsburgh Power ===
Week 14: Pittsburgh Power at Tampa Bay Storm – Game summary

Quarter	1	2	3	4	Total
Power	21	14	13	7	55
Storm	21	13	12	16	62

at St. Pete Times Forum, Tampa, Florida

- Date: June 11
- Game time: 7:30 p.m. EDT
- Game attendance: 11,756
- Referee: Alex Kemp
- Recap

Game information

1st quarter

- Pittsburgh – (12:56) Michael Washington 20-yard pass from Bernard Morris (Paul Edinger kick), Pittsburgh 7–0
- Tampa Bay – (10:42) Huey Whittaker 27-yard pass from Brian Zbydniewski (Kyle Chilton kick), Tied 7–7
- Pittsburgh – (7:56) Jerome Mathis 22-yard pass from Bernard Morris (Paul Edinger kick), Pittsburgh 14–7
- Tampa Bay – (6:01) Huey Whittaker 25-yard pass from Brian Zbydniewski (Kyle Chilton kick), Tied 14–14
- Pittsburgh – (5:06) Jerome Mathis 57-yard kickoff return (Paul Edinger kick), Pittsburgh 21–14
- Tampa Bay – (1:50) Hank Edwards 30-yard pass from Brian Zbydniewski (Kyle Chilton kick), Tied 21–21

2nd quarter

- Tampa Bay – (13:07) Amarri Jackson 27-yard pass from Brian Zbydniewski (Kyle Chilton kick), Tampa Bay 28–21
- Pittsburgh – (8:23) Michael Washington 25-yard pass from Bernard Morris (Paul Edinger kick), Tied 28–28
- Tampa Bay – (5:52) Terrence Royal 5-yard run (Kyle Chilton kick failed), Tampa Bay 34–28
- Pittsburgh – (0:31) Lonnell Dewalt 5-yard pass from Bernard Morris (Paul Edinger kick), Pittsburgh 35–34

3rd quarter

- Tampa Bay – (9:47) Huey Whittaker 11-yard pass from Brian Zbydniewski (Kyle Chilton kick blocked), Tampa Bay 40–35
- Pittsburgh – (8:31) Jerome Mathis 45-yard pass from Bernard Morris (Paul Edinger kick failed), Pittsburgh 41–40
- Tampa Bay – (3:16) Amarri Jackson 4-yard pass from Brian Zbydniewski (Kyle Chilton kick failed), Tampa Bay 46–41
- Pittsburgh – (1:03) Jerome Mathis 46-yard pass from Bernard Morris (Paul Edinger kick), Pittsburgh 48–46

4th quarter

- Tampa Bay – (13:33) Hank Edwards 19-yard pass from Brian Zbydniewski (Kyle Chilton kick failed), Tampa Bay 52–48
- Tampa Bay – (9:37) Kyle Chilton 19-yard field goal, Tampa Bay 55–48
- Tampa Bay – (5:11) Amarri Jackson 41-yard pass from Brian Zbydniewski (Kyle Chilton kick), Tampa Bay 62–48
- Pittsburgh – (0:27) Michael Washington 2-yard pass from Bernard Morris (Paul Edinger kick), Tampa Bay 62–55

Passing

- Pittsburgh – Bernard Morris: 29/46, 335 yards, 7 TD, 1 INT
- Tampa Bay – Brian Zbydniewski: 24/34, 372 yards, 8 TD, 1 INT

Rushing

- Pittsburgh – Bernard Morris: 2 att, 7 yards
- Tampa Bay – Terrance Royal: 2 att, 18 yards, 1 TD

Receiving

- Pittsburgh – Jerome Mathis: 12 rec, 195 yards, 3 TD
- Tampa Bay – Amari Jackson: 11 rec, 158 yards, 3 TD

=== Week 15: vs. Orlando Predators ===
Week 15: Orlando Predators at Tampa Bay Storm – Game summary

Quarter	1	2	3	4	Total
Predators	7	9	7	21	44
Storm	12	20	7	7	46

at St. Pete Times Forum, Tampa, Florida

- Date: June 17
- Game time: 8:00 p.m. EDT
- Game attendance: 11,151
- Referee: Tom McCabe
- Recap

Game information

1st quarter

- Tampa Bay – (7:06) Amarri Jackson 4-yard pass from Brian Zbydniewski (Kyle Chilton rush fumbled), Tampa Bay 6–0
- Orlando – (5:16) T.T. Toliver 39-yard pass from Nick Hill (Mark Lewis kick), Orlando 7–6
- Tampa Bay – (3:58) Amarri Jackson 36-yard pass from Brian Zbydniewski (Kyle Chilton kick blocked), Tampa Bay 12–7

2nd quarter

- Tampa Bay – (14:55) Amarri Jackson 30-yard pass from Brian Zbydniewski (Kyle Chilton kick), Tampa Bay 19–7
- Tampa Bay – (13:31) Erick McIntosh 18-yard interception return (Kyle Chilton kick), Tampa Bay 26–7
- Orlando – (9:50) Travis Coleman 5-yard pass from Nick Hill (Mark Lewis kick), Tampa Bay 26–14
- Tampa Bay – (7:42) Huey Whittaker 3-yard pass from Brian Zbydniewski (Kyle Chilton kick blocked), Tampa Bay 32–14
- Orlando – (7:42) Kenny McEntyre PAT return, Tampa Bay 32–16

3rd quarter

- Tampa Bay – (11:25) Amarri Jackson 8-yard pass from Brian Zbydniewski (Kyle Chilton kick), Tampa Bay 39–16
- Orlando – (8:42) Robert Quiroga 9-yard pass from Nick Hill (Mark Lewis kick), Tampa Bay 39–23

4th quarter

- Orlando – (12:49) Josh Bosh 20-yard pass from Nick Hill (Mark Lewis kick), Tampa Bay 39–30
- Orlando – (6:46) T.T. Toliver 29-yard pass from Nick Hill (Mark Lewis kick), Tampa Bay 39–37
- Tampa Bay – (4:24) Amarri Jackson 18-yard pass from Brian Zbydniewski (Kyle Chilton kick), Tampa Bay 46–37
- Orlando – (0:56) Robert Quiroga 2-yard pass from Nick Hill (Mark Lewis kick), Tampa Bay 46–44

Passing

- Orlando – Nick Hill: 25/37, 268 yards, 6 TD, 2 INT
- Tampa Bay – Brian Zbydniewski: 19/32, 231 yards, 6 TD, 2 INT

Rushing

- Orlando – Nick Hill: 3 att, 21 yards
- Tampa Bay – Brian Zbydniewski: 1 att, 1 yard

Receiving

- Orlando – T.T. Toliver: 9 rec, 150 yards, 2 TD
- Tampa Bay – Amari Jackson: 11 rec, 151 yards, 5 TD

=== Week 16: at Jacksonville Sharks ===
Week 16: Tampa Bay Storm at Jacksonville Sharks – Game summary

Quarter	1	2	3	4	Total
Storm	21	7	6	7	41
Sharks	14	23	22	7	66

at Jacksonville Veterans Memorial Arena, Jacksonville, Florida

- Date: June 25
- Game time: 7:00 p.m. EDT
- Game attendance: 10,517
- Referee: Joe Pester
- Recap

Game information

1st quarter

- Tampa Bay – (11:14) Hank Edwards 6-yard pass from Brian Zbydniewski (Kyle Chilton kick), Tampa Bay 7–0
- Jacksonville – (9:45) Jeff Hughley 35-yard pass from Aaron Garcia (Marco Capozzoli kick), Tied 7–7
- Tampa Bay – (8:27) Amarri Jackson 45-yard pass from Brian Zbydniewski (Kyle Chilton kick), Tampa Bay 14–7
- Jacksonville – (5:58) Jamarko Simmons 16-yard pass from Aaron Garcia (Marco Capozzoli kick), Tied 14–14
- Tampa Bay – (1:54) Amarri Jackson 25-yard pass from Brian Zbydniewski (Kyle Chilton kick), Tampa Bay 21–14

2nd quarter

- Jacksonville – (13:55) Jamarko Simmons 2-yard pass from Aaron Garcia (Marco Capozzoli kick failed), Tampa Bay 21–20
- Jacksonville – (10:08) Jeff Hughley 10-yard pass from Aaron Garcia (Marco Capozzoli kick), Jacksonville 27–21
- Jacksonville – (4:05) Jomo Wilson 13-yard pass from Aaron Garcia (Marco Capozzoli kick), Jacksonville 34–21
- Tampa Bay – (0:43) Amarri Jackson 20-yard pass from Brian Zbydniewski (Kyle Chilton kick), Jacksonville 34–28
- Jacksonville – (0:07) Marco Capozzoli 18-yard field goal, Jacksonville 37–28

3rd quarter

- Jacksonville – (12:05) Jeff Hughley 4-yard pass from Aaron Garcia (Marco Capozzoli kick blocked), Jacksonville 43–28
- Jacksonville – (8:24) Jeff Hughley 5-yard pass from Aaron Garcia (Marco Capozzoli kick), Jacksonville 50–28
- Jacksonville – (4:54) Team safety, Jacksonville 52–28
- Jacksonville – (4:20) Jeff Hughley 45-yard pass from Aaron Garcia (Marco Capozzoli kick), Jacksonville 59–28
- Tampa Bay – (0:53) Hank Edwards 3-yard pass from Brian Zbydniewski (Kyle Chilton kick failed), Jacksonville 59–34

4th quarter

- Jacksonville – (13:40) Jeff Hughley 23-yard pass from Aaron Garcia (Marco Capozzoli kick), Jacksonville 66–34
- Tampa Bay – (8:39) Amarri Jackson 9-yard pass from Brian Zbydniewski (Kyle Chilton kick), Jacksonville 66–41

Passing

- Tampa Bay – Brian Zbydniewski: 27/44, 341 yards, 6 TD, 1 INT
- Jacksonville – Aaron Garcia: 22/27, 288 yards, 9 TD

Rushing

- Tampa Bay – Brian Zbydniewski: 4 att, 1 yard
- Jacksonville – Omar Jacobs: 1 att, 2 yards

Receiving

- Tampa Bay – Amarri Jackson: 14 rec, 187 yards, 4 TD
- Jacksonville – Jeff Hughley: 13 rec, 210 yards, 6 TD

=== Week 17: vs. New Orleans VooDoo ===
Week 17: New Orleans VooDoo at Tampa Bay Storm – Game summary

Quarter	1	2	3	4	Total
VooDoo	10	21	7	26	64
Storm	13	12	0	8	33

at St. Pete Times Forum, Tampa, Florida

- Date: July 1
- Game time: 7:30 p.m. EDT
- Game attendance: 12,016
- Referee: Tom Cannella
- Recap

Game information

1st quarter

- New Orleans – (13:16) Skyler Green 23-yard pass from D. Bryant (Jonathan Ruffin kick), New Orleans 7–0
- Tampa Bay – (11:33) Hank Edwards 25-yard pass from Brian Zbydniewski (Kyle Chilton kick failed), New Orleans 7–6
- New Orleans – (4:57) Jonathan Ruffin 29-yard field goal, New Orleans 10–6
- Tampa Bay – (0:51) Huey Whittaker 18-yard pass from Brian Zbydniewski (Kyle Chilton kick), Tampa Bay 13–10

2nd quarter

- New Orleans – (8:12) L.J. Castile 5-yard pass from D. Bryant (Jonathan Ruffin kick), New Orleans 17–13
- Tampa Bay – (6:27) Amarri Jackson 34-yard pass from Brian Zbydniewski (Kyle Chilton kick failed), Tampa Bay 19–17
- New Orleans – (1:22) Carlese Franklin 15-yard pass from D. Bryant (Jonathan Ruffin kick), New Orleans 24–19
- Tampa Bay – (0:34) Amarri Jackson 2-yard pass from Brian Zbydniewski (Kyle Chilton kick failed), Tampa Bay 25–24
- New Orleans – (0:00) Danny Wimprine 3-yard run (Jonathan Ruffin kick), New Orleans 31–25

3rd quarter

- New Orleans – (11:23) P.J. Berry 2-yard pass from D. Bryant (Jonathan Ruffin kick), New Orleans 38–25

4th quarter

- New Orleans – (14:56) P.J. Berry 1-yard run (Danny Wimprine rush failed), New Orleans 44–25
- New Orleans – (10:26) Carlese Franklin 20-yard pass from D. Bryant (Jonathan Ruffin kick failed), New Orleans 50–25
- New Orleans – (8:53) Alvin Jackson 20-yard interception return (Jonathan Ruffin kick), New Orleans 57–25
- Tampa Bay – (6:20) Hank Edwards 25-yard pass from Danny Southwick (Danny Southwick pass), New Orleans 57–33
- New Orleans – (2:14) D. Bryant 1-yard run (Jonathan Ruffin kick), New Orleans 64–33

Passing

- New Orleans – D. Bryant: 24/43, 215 yards, 5 TD
- Tampa Bay – Brian Zbydniewski: 17/26, 189 yards, 4 TD, 3 INT

Rushing

- New Orleans – Tom Taggert: 5 att, 20 yards
- Tampa Bay – Terrance Royal: 1 att, 2 yards

Receiving

- New Orleans – Carlese Franklin: 6 rec, 71 yards, 2 TD
- Tampa Bay – Amarri Jackson: 11 rec, 123 yards, 2 TD

=== Week 18: at Tulsa Talons ===
Week 18: Tampa Bay Storm at Tulsa Talons – Game summary

Quarter	1	2	3	4	Total
Storm	6	7	7	13	33
Talons	14	28	28	0	70

at BOK Center, Tulsa, Oklahoma

- Date: July 9
- Game time: 8:00 p.m. EDT
- Game attendance: 4,945
- Referee: Joe Pester
- Recap

Game information

1st quarter

- Tulsa – (14:16) Jamar Ransom 0-yard fumble recovery (Juan Bongarra kick), Tulsa 7–0
- Tampa Bay – (9:21) Hank Edwards 5-yard pass from Brian Zbydniewski (Kyle Chilton kick failed), Tulsa 7–6
- Tulsa – (7:22) Brandon Copeland 15-yard pass from Justin Allgood (Juan Bongarra kick), Tulsa 14–6

2nd quarter

- Tulsa – (12:34) Troy McBroom 14-yard pass from Justin Allgood (Juan Bongarra kick), Tulsa 21–6
- Tampa Bay – (10:44) Hank Edwards 25-yard pass from Brian Zbydniewski (Kyle Chilton kick), Tulsa 21–13
- Tulsa – (8:53) Brandon Copeland 45-yard pass from Justin Allgood (Juan Bongarra kick), Tulsa 28–13
- Tulsa – (2:08) Bobby Reid 1-yard run (Juan Bongarra kick), Tulsa 35–13
- Tulsa – (0:08) Troy McBroom 18-yard pass from Justin Allgood (Juan Bongarra kick), Tulsa 42–13

3rd quarter

- Tulsa – (12:15) Troy McBroom 5-yard pass from Justin Allgood (Juan Bongarra kick), Tulsa 49–13
- Tampa Bay – (10:00) Huey Whittaker 16-yard pass from Brian Zbydniewski (Kyle Chilton kick), Tulsa 49–20
- Tulsa – (8:35) Brandon Copeland 6-yard pass from Justin Allgood (Juan Bongarra kick), Tulsa 56–20
- Tulsa – (3:22) J.J. Payne 24-yard run (Juan Bongarra kick), Tulsa 63–20
- Tulsa – (0:08) Brandon Copeland 7-yard pass from Justin Allgood (Juan Bongarra kick), Tulsa 70–20

4th quarter

- Tampa Bay – (13:46) Huey Whittaker 6-yard pass from Danny Southwick (Kyle Chilton kick), Tulsa 70–27
- Tampa Bay – (7:05) Markihe Anderson 20-yard interception return (Kyle Chilton kick failed), Tulsa 70–33

Passing

- Tampa Bay – Brian Zbydniewski: 15/29, 197 yards, 3 TD, 1 INT
- Tulsa – Justin Allgood: 21/34, 220 yards, 7 TD

Rushing

- Tampa Bay – Terrance Royal: 1 att, 2 yards
- Tulsa – Bobby Reid: 5 att, 54 yards, 1 TD

Receiving

- Tampa Bay – Hank Edwards: 6 rec, 107 yards, 2 TD
- Tulsa – Brandon Copeland: 9 rec, 107 yards, 4 TD

=== Week 19: vs. Georgia Force ===
Week 19: Georgia Force at Tampa Bay Storm – Game summary

Quarter	1	2	3	4	Total
Force	3	28	14	13	58
Storm	0	7	20	13	40

at St. Pete Times Forum, Tampa, Florida

- Date: July 16
- Game time: 7:30 p.m. EDT
- Game attendance: 9,700
- Referee: Tom McCabe
- Recap

Game information

1st quarter

- Georgia – (9:49) Carlos Martinez 19-yard field goal, Georgia 3–0

2nd quarter

- Georgia – (9:44) Lance Ancar 1-yard run (Carlos Martinez kick), Georgia 10–0
- Georgia – (3:21) Larry Shipp 30-yard pass from Darnell Kennedy (Carlos Martinez kick), Georgia 17–0
- Tampa Bay – (1:53) Hank Edwards 18-yard pass from Danny Southwick (Greg Gunderson kick), Georgia 17–7
- Georgia – (0:13) C.J. Johnson 4-yard pass from Darnell Kennedy (Carlos Martinez kick), Georgia 24–7
- Georgia – (0:09) Eric Scott 2-yard fumble recovery (Carlos Martinez kick), Georgia 31–7

3rd quarter

- Tampa Bay – (11:48) Michael Lindsey 40-yard pass from Matt Grothe (Greg Gunderson kick), Georgia 31–14
- Tampa Bay – (11:31) Tom Kaleita 5-yard pass from Matt Grothe (Greg Gunderson kick failed), Georgia 31–20
- Georgia – (10:02) Mike Johnson 6-yard pass from Darnell Kennedy (Carlos Martinez kick), Georgia 38–20
- Tampa Bay – (6:29) Amarri Jackson 29-yard pass from Matt Grothe (Greg Gunderson kick), Georgia 38–27
- Georgia – (4:16) C.J. Johnson 18-yard pass from Darnell Kennedy (Carlos Martinez kick), Georgia 45–27

4th quarter

- Tampa Bay – (14:54) Amarri Jackson 12-yard pass from Matt Grothe (Greg Gunderson kick), Georgia 45–34
- Georgia – (4:54) Mike Johnson 29-yard pass from Darnell Kennedy (Carlos Martinez kick), Georgia 52–34
- Georgia – (3:18) Tracy Belton 30-yard interception return (Carlos Martinez kick failed), Georgia 58–34
- Tampa Bay – (0:43) Amarri Jackson 17-yard pass from Matt Grothe (Greg Gunderson kick failed), Georgia 58–40

Passing

- Georgia – Darnell Kennedy: 12/20, 130 yards, 5 TD, 1 INT
- Tampa Bay – Matt Grothe: 12/24, 161 yards, 5 TD, 1 INT

Rushing

- Georgia – Lance Ancar: 3 att, 8 yards, 1 TD
- Tampa Bay – Danny Southwick: 1 att, 9 yards

Receiving

- Georgia – Mike Johnson: 7 rec, 61 yards, 2 TD
- Tampa Bay – Amarri Jackson: 8 rec, 112 yards, 3 TD

=== Week 20: vs. San Jose SaberCats ===
Quarter	1	2	Total
SaberCats			0
Storm			0

at St. Pete Times Forum, Tampa, Florida

- Date: July 23
- Game time: 7:30 p.m. EDT
