= 2011 Orlando Predators season =

Arena Football League team season

- Head coach: Pat O'Hara
- Home stadium: Amway Center

Results
- Record: 11–7
- Division place: 3rd AC South
- Playoffs: Lost Conference Semifinals (Sharks) 48–63

The 2011 Orlando Predators season was the 20th season for the franchise in the Arena Football League. The team was coached by Pat O'Hara. This was the Predators' first season at Amway Center. The Predators finished the regular season 11–7, qualifying for the playoffs for the 19th consecutive season. As the 4th seed in the American Conference, they lost to the Jacksonville Sharks in the conference semifinals, 48–63.

== Standings ==
South Division
Team	W	L	PCT	PF	PA	DIV	CON	Home	Away
z-Jacksonville Sharks	14	4	.778	1158	908	8–0	12–0	8–1	6–3
x-Georgia Force	11	7	.611	1007	931	7–5	5–3	5–4	6–3
x-Orlando Predators	11	7	.611	1001	933	4–4	8–4	6–3	5–4
Tampa Bay Storm	7	11	.389	802	993	2–6	4–8	4–5	3–6
New Orleans VooDoo	3	15	.167	826	1017	1–7	2–10	0–9	3–6

z - Clinched division and conference's best record
x - Clinched playoff berth

== Season schedule ==
=== Preseason ===
Day	Date	Kickoff	Opponent	Score	Location	Report
Thursday	March 3	7:30 p.m. EST	at Tampa Bay Storm	W 63–30	St. Pete Times Forum	

=== Regular season ===
The Predators had a bye during Week 1, and began the season the following week on the road against the New Orleans VooDoo on March 18. They played their first game at Amway Center against the Utah Blaze on March 24. On July 23, they will host New Orleans for their final regular season game.

Week	Day	Date	Kickoff	Opponent	Results		Location	Report
Week	Day	Date	Kickoff	Opponent	Score	Record	Location	Report
1	Bye							
2	Friday	March 18	8:00 p.m. EDT	at New Orleans VooDoo	W 47–34	1–0	New Orleans Arena	
3	Saturday	March 26	7:30 p.m. EDT	Utah Blaze	W 68–53	2–0	Amway Center	
4	Saturday	April 2	10:00 p.m. EDT	at Arizona Rattlers	L 47–48	2–1	US Airways Center	
5	Saturday	April 9	7:30 p.m. EDT	Philadelphia Soul	W 53–46	3–1	Amway Center	
6	Saturday	April 16	7:30 p.m. EDT	at Georgia Force	W 48–43	4–1	Arena at Gwinnett Center	
7	Saturday	April 23	7:30 p.m. EDT	Spokane Shock	L 70–58	4–2	Amway Center	
8	Saturday	April 30	8:00 p.m. EDT	at Jacksonville Sharks	L 55–76	4–3	Jacksonville Veterans Memorial Arena	
9	Friday	May 6	8:00 p.m. EDT	Tampa Bay Storm	W 63–61	5–3	Amway Center	
10	Saturday	May 14	7:30 p.m. EDT	Cleveland Gladiators	W 56–26	6–3	Amway Center	
11	Bye							
12	Thursday	May 26	8:00 p.m. EDT	at Milwaukee Mustangs	W 35–30	7–3	Bradley Center	
13	Saturday	June 4	8:05 p.m. EDT	at Iowa Barnstormers	W 77–61	8–3	Wells Fargo Arena	
14	Saturday	June 11	7:30 p.m. EDT	Jacksonville Sharks	L 67–68	8–4	Amway Center	
15	Friday	June 17	8:00 p.m. EDT	at Tampa Bay Storm	L 44–46	8–5	St. Pete Times Forum	
16	Saturday	June 25	7:30 p.m. EDT	Georgia Force	L 34–64	8–6	Amway Center	
17	Friday	July 1	8:00 p.m. EDT	Pittsburgh Power	W 62–54	9–6	Amway Center	
18	Saturday	July 9	10:30 p.m. EDT	at San Jose SaberCats	L 40–60	9–7	HP Pavilion at San Jose	
19	Saturday	July 16	8:00 p.m. EDT	at Tulsa Talons	W 85–49	10–7	BOK Center	
20	Saturday	July 23	7:30 p.m. EDT	New Orleans VooDoo	W 62–44	11–7	Amway Center	

=== Playoffs ===
Round	Day	Date	Kickoff	Opponent	Results	Location	Report
AC Semifinals	Friday	July 29	8:00 p.m. EDT	at Jacksonville Sharks	L 48–63	Jacksonville Veterans Memorial Arena	

== Roster ==
2011 Orlando Predators final roster
Quarterbacks: 11 Nick Hill; 12 Collin Drafts; Fullbacks: 9 Marlon Moye-Moore FB/LB; 42 James Lynch FB/LB; 92 Bert Whigham FB/LB; Wide receivers: -- Daron Clark; 15 Chris Duvalt; 16 Doug Gabriel WR; 18 Josh Bush KR/WR/DB; 81 Robert Quiroga WR/LB; 3 Bobby Sippio; 17 T. T. Toliver	Offensive linemen: 40 Joe Alajajian; -- Thaddeus Coleman OL; 95 Arrion Dixon OL/DL; 65 Christopher Jamison; 99 Jamarr Ward; 55 Julius Wilson OL/DL; Defensive linemen': 90 George Gause OL/DL; 54 Paul Griffin; 98 Frisner Nelson; 44 Mark Robinson	Linebackers: 5 Johnnie Balous; 52 Pierre Turner; Defensive backs: 2 Travis Coleman; 1 Andy Dorcely; 6 Rayshaun Kizer; 28 Kenny McEntyre; Kickers: 10 Mark Lewis; rookies in italics

== Regular season ==
=== Week 2: at New Orleans VooDoo ===
Week 2: Orlando Predators at New Orleans VooDoo – Game summary

Quarter	1	2	3	4	Total
Predators	7	14	13	13	47
VooDoo	7	7	14	6	34

at New Orleans Arena, New Orleans, Louisiana

- Date: March 18
- Game time: 8:00 p.m. EDT
- Game attendance: 8,543
- Referee: Joe Pester
- Recap

Game information

1st quarter

- New Orleans – (13:14) Jason Schule 6-yard run (Jonathan Ruffin kick), New Orleans 7–0
- Orlando – (5:25) T.T. Toliver 13-yard pass from Nick Hill (Mark Lewis kick), Tied 7–7

2nd quarter

- Orlando – (13:00) Nick Hill 3-yard run (Mark Lewis kick), Orlando 14–7
- Orlando – (7:00) T.T. Toliver 10-yard pass from Nick Hill (Mark Lewis kick), Orlando 21–7
- New Orleans – (1:12) Carlese Franklin 11-yard pass from Danny Wimprine (Jonathan Ruffin kick), Orlando 21–14

3rd quarter

- Orlando – (10:35) Marlon Moye-Moore 2-yard run (Mark Lewis kick failed), Orlando 27–14
- New Orleans – (8:46) P.J. Berry 24-yard pass from Danny Wimprine (Jonathan Ruffin kick), Orlando 27–21
- Orlando – (7:00) Doug Gabriel 3-yard pass from Nick Hill (Mark Lewis kick), Orlando 34–21
- New Orleans – (1:12) P.J. Berry 36-yard pass from Danny Wimprine (Jonathan Ruffin kick), Orlando 34–28

4th quarter

- Orlando – (10:56) Robert Quiroga 36-yard pass from Nick Hill (Mark Lewis kick failed), Orlando 40–28
- Orlando – (0:55) Nick Hill 6-yard run (Mark Lewis kick), Orlando 47–28
- New Orleans – (0:00) P.J. Berry 4-yard pass from Danny Wimprine, Orlando 47–34

Passing

- Orlando – Nick Hill: 25/36, 290 yards, 4 TD, 1 INT
- New Orleans – Danny Wimprine: 16/28, 223 yards, 4 TD, 2 INT

Rushing

- Orlando – Nick Hill: 11 att, 44 yards, 2 TD
- New Orleans – Jason Schule: 5 att, 21 yards, 1 TD

Receiving

- Orlando – T.T. Toliver: 13 rec, 146 yards, 2 TD
- New Orleans – P.J. Berry: 8 rec, 118 yards, 3 TD

=== Week 3: vs. Utah Blaze ===
Week 3: Utah Blaze at Orlando Predators – Game summary

Quarter	1	2	3	4	Total
Blaze	13	6	14	20	53
Predators	14	23	7	24	68

at Amway Center, Orlando, Florida

- Date: March 26
- Game time: 7:30 p.m. EDT
- Game attendance: 12,186
- Referee: Kevin Stine
- Recap

Game information

1st quarter

- Orlando – (14:27) Bobby Sippio 29-yard pass from Nick Hill (Mark Lewis kick), Orlando 7–0
- Utah – (12:17) Aaron Boone 9-yard pass from Tommy Grady (John Wehrle kick), Tied 7–7
- Orlando – (10:31) T.T. Toliver 13-yard pass from Nick Hill (Mark Lewis kick), Orlando 14–7
- Utah – (7:39) Aaron Lesue 9-yard pass from Tommy Grady (John Wehrle kick failed), Orlando 14–13

2nd quarter

- Orlando – (13:08) T.T. Toliver 10-yard pass from Nick Hill (Mark Lewis kick), Orlando 21–13
- Orlando – (6:54) Robert Quiroga 2-yard pass from Nick Hill (Mark Lewis kick), Orlando 28–13
- Orlando – (2:37) Bobby Sippio 9-yard pass from Nick Hill (Collin Drafts rush failed), Orlando 34–13
- Utah – (0:35) Aaron Boone 2-yard pass from Tommy Grady (Ben Stallings rush failed), Orlando 34–19
- Orlando – (0:00) Mark Lewis 31-yard field goal, Orlando 37–19

3rd quarter

- Utah – (12:47) Aaron Boone 4-yard pass from Tommy Grady (Tommy Grady pass), Orlando 37–27
- Orlando – (5:55) Robert Quiroga 5-yard pass from Nick Hill (Mark Lewis kick), Orlando 44–27
- Utah – (3:53) Ernest Pierce 2-yard pass from Tommy Grady (John Wehrle kick failed), Orlando 44–33

4th quarter

- Orlando – (14:55) T.T. Toliver 34-yard pass from Nick Hill (Mark Lewis kick), Orlando 51–33
- Orlando – (11:31) Rayshaun Kizer 20-yard interception return (Mark Lewis kick), Orlando 58–33
- Utah – (6:38) Aaron Boone 9-yard pass from Tommy Grady (Tommy Grady pass intercepted), Orlando 58–39
- Orlando – (3:29) Mark Lewis 36-yard field goal, Orlando 61–39
- Utah – (0:33) Aaron Boone 4-yard pass from Tommy Grady (Tommy Grady pass failed), Orlando 61–45
- Orlando – (0:26) Robert Quiroga 34-yard pass from Nick Hill (Mark Lewis kick), Orlando 68–45
- Utah – (0:02) Aaron Boone 6-yard pass from Tommy Grady (Ben Stallings rush), Orlando 68–53

Passing

- Utah – Tommy Grady: 31/49, 318 yards, 8 TD, 3 INT
- Orlando – Nick Hill: 24/36, 331 yards, 8 TD, 1 INT

Rushing

- Utah – Tommy Grady: 2 att, 2 yards
- Orlando – Nick Hill: 1 att, 10 yards

Receiving

- Utah – Ernest Pierce: 12 rec, 138 yards, 1 TD
- Orlando – T.T. Toliver: 9 rec, 124 yards, 3 TD

=== Week 4: at Arizona Rattlers ===
Week 4: Orlando Predators at Arizona Rattlers – Game summary

Quarter	1	2	3	4	Total
Predators	21	6	14	6	47
Rattlers	0	12	14	22	48

at US Airways Center, Phoenix, Arizona

- Date: April 2
- Game time: 10:00 p.m. EDT
- Game attendance: 9,977
- Referee: Shane Anderson
- Recap

Game information

1st quarter

- Orlando – (9:08) Marlon Moye-Moore 1-yard run (Mark Lewis kick), Orlando 7–0
- Orlando – (3:22) T.T. Toliver 20-yard pass from Nick Hill (Mark Lewis kick), Orlando 14–0
- Orlando – (1:57) Marlon Moye-Moore 21-yard interception return (Mark Lewis kick), Orlando 21–0

2nd quarter

- Arizona – (14:58) Nate Forse 3-yard pass from Nick Davila (Joe Schroeder kick failed), Orlando 21–6
- Orlando – (9:20) Bobby Sippio 8-yard pass from Nick Hill, Orlando 27–6
- Arizona – (7:40) Trandon Harvey 28-yard pass from Nick Davila (Trevor Harris rush failed), Orlando 27–12

3rd quarter

- Arizona – (12:01) Trandon Harvey 4-yard pass from Nick Davila (Joe Schroeder kick), Orlando 27–19
- Orlando – (9:43) Robert Quiroga 25-yard pass from Nick Hill (Mark Lewis kick), Orlando 34–19
- Arizona – (4:00) Trandon Harvey 4-yard pass from Nick Davila (Joe Schroeder kick), Orlando 34–26
- Orlando – (0:46) T.T. Toliver 5-yard pass from Nick Hill (Mark Lewis kick), Orlando 41–26

4th quarter

- Arizona – (12:36) Trandon Harvey 29-yard pass from Nick Davila (Nick Davila pass), Orlando 41–34
- Orlando – (10:48) Robert Quiroga 14-yard pass from Nick Hill (Mark Lewis kick failed), Orlando 47–34
- Arizona – (5:41) Odie Armstrong 1-yard run (Joe Schroeder kick failed), Orlando 47–40
- Arizona – (0:08) Jason Geathers 14-yard pass from Nick Davila (Joe Schroeder pass), Arizona 48–47

Passing

- Orlando – Nick Hill: 24/34, 312 yards, 5 TD, 2 INT
- Arizona – Nick Davila: 25/39, 344 yards, 6 TD, 3 INT

Rushing

- Orlando – Nick Hill: 9 att, 17 yards
- Arizona – Odie Armstrong: 2 att, 1 yard, 1 TD

Receiving

- Orlando – Bobby Sippio: 12 rec, 149 yards, 1 TD
- Arizona – Trandon Harvey: 9 rec, 117 yards, 4 TD

=== Week 5: vs. Philadelphia Soul ===
Week 5: Philadelphia Soul at Orlando Predators – Game summary

Quarter	1	2	3	4	Total
Soul	14	13	7	12	46
Predators	12	6	14	21	53

at Amway Center, Orlando, Florida

- Date: April 9
- Game time: 7:30 p.m. EDT
- Referee: Joe Pester
- Recap

Game information

1st quarter

- Philadelphia – (13:00) Ryan Vena 32-yard run (Massimo Scaccia kick), Philadelphia 7–0
- Orlando – (6:57) T.T. Toliver 4-yard pass from Nick Hill (Mark Lewis kick failed), Philadelphia 7–6
- Philadelphia – (5:05) Larry Brackins 9-yard pass from Ryan Vena (Massimo Scaccia kick), Philadelphia 14–6
- Orlando – (0:44) Bobby Sippio 10-yard pass from Nick Hill (Mark Lewis kick failed), Philadelphia 14–12

2nd quarter

- Philadelphia – (12:21) Ryan Vena 6-yard run (Massimo Scaccia kick), Philadelphia 21–12
- Philadelphia – (9:13) Tanner Varner 36-yard interception return (Massimo Scaccia kick failed), Philadelphia 27–12
- Orlando – (3:36) Bobby Sippio 17-yard pass from Nick Hill (Nick Hill pass failed), Philadelphia 27–18

3rd quarter

- Orlando – (6:27) T.T. Toliver 11-yard pass from Collin Drafts (Mark Lewis kick), Philadelphia 27–25
- Philadelphia – (5:17) Donovan Morgan 42-yard pass from Ryan Vena (Massimo Scaccia kick), Philadelphia 34–25
- Orlando – (0:22) T.T. Toliver 7-yard pass from Nick Hill (Mark Lewis kick), Philadelphia 34–32

4th quarter

- Philadelphia – (12:18) Donovan Morgan 39-yard pass from Ryan Vena (Massimo Scaccia kick failed), Philadelphia 40–32
- Orlando – (8:36) Bobby Sippio 11-yard pass from Nick Hill (Mark Lewis kick), Philadelphia 40–39
- Orlando – (3:30) Bobby Sippio 6-yard pass from Nick Hill (Nick Hill pass failed), Orlando 45–40
- Philadelphia – (0:44) Donovan Morgan 24-yard pass from Ryan Vena (Ryan Vena pass failed), Philadelphia 46–45
- Orlando – (0:18) James Lynch 3-yard run (Nick Hill pass), Orlando 53–46

Passing

- Philadelphia – Ryan Vena: 16/26, 263 yards, 4 TD, 2 INT
- Orlando – Nick Hill: 28/40, 309 yards, 6 TD, 1 INT

Rushing

- Philadelphia – Ryan Vena: 3 att, 47 yards, 2 TD
- Orlando – James Lynch: 4 att, 17 yards, 1 TD

Receiving

- Philadelphia – Donovan Morgan: 7 rec, 156 yards, 3 TD
- Orlando – T.T. Toliver: 13 rec, 131 yards, 3 TD

=== Week 6: at Georgia Force ===
Week 6: Orlando Predators at Georgia Force – Game summary

Quarter	1	2	3	4	Total
Predators	7	7	14	20	48
Force	21	3	13	6	43

at Arena at Gwinnett Center, Duluth, Georgia

- Date: April 16
- Game time: 7:30 p.m. EDT
- Game attendance: 3,797
- Referee: Scott Vaughn
- Recap

Game information

1st quarter

- Georgia – (14:46) C.J. Johnson 57-yard kickoff return (Carlos Martinez kick), Georgia 7–0
- Georgia – (6:40) C.J. Johnson 1-yard pass from Larry Shipp (Carlos Martinez kick), Georgia 14–0
- Orlando – (4:30) Robert Quiroga 14-yard pass from Nick Hill (Mark Lewis kick), Georgia 14–7
- Georgia – (1:40) Maurice Purify 8-yard pass from Brett Elliott (Carlos Martinez kick), Georgia 21–7

2nd quarter

- Orlando – (14:16) T.T. Toliver 28-yard pass from Nick Hill (Mark Lewis kick), Georgia 21–14
- Georgia – (0:04) Carlos Martinez 17-yard field goal, Georgia 24–14

3rd quarter

- Orlando – (12:36) Bobby Sippio 10-yard pass from Nick Hill (Mark Lewis kick), Georgia 24–21
- Georgia – (9:15) Mike Johnson 6-yard pass from Brett Elliott (Carlos Martinez kick), Georgia 31–21
- Orlando – (2:17) T.T. Toliver 6-yard pass from Nick Hill (Mark Lewis kick), Georgia 31–28
- Georgia – (0:46) Maurice Purify 29-yard pass from Brett Elliott (Carlos Martinez kick failed), Georgia 37–28

4th quarter

- Orlando – (12:32) Robert Quiroga 3-yard pass from Nick Hill (Mark Lewis kick), Georgia 37–35
- Orlando – (4:59) Marlon Moye-Moore 1-yard run (Mark Lewis kick), Orlando 42–37
- Georgia – (1:11) Darnell Kennedy 7-yard run (Darnell Kennedy pass failed), Georgia 43–42
- Orlando – (0:38) Nick Hill 23-yard run (Nick Hill pass failed), Orlando 48–43

Passing

- Orlando – Nick Hill: 25/40, 328 yards, 5 TD
- Georgia – Brett Elliott: 20/27, 215 yards, 3 TD, 2 INT

Rushing

- Orlando – Nick Hill: 3 att, 29 yards, 1 TD
- Georgia – Darnell Kennedy: 3 att, 12 yards, 1 TD

Receiving

- Orlando – T.T. Toliver: 7 rec, 111 yards, 2 TD
- Georgia – Murice Purify: 7 rec, 95 yards, 2 TD

=== Week 7: vs. Spokane Shock ===
Week 7: Spokane Shock at Orlando Predators – Game summary

Quarter	1	2	3	4	Total
Shock	21	14	14	21	70
Predators	7	21	10	20	58

at Amway Center, Orlando, Florida

- Date: April 23
- Game time: 7:30 p.m. EDT
- Game attendance: 11,756
- Referee: Shawn Anderson
- Recap

Game information

1st quarter

- Spokane – (12:22) Shaun Kauleinamoku 13-yard pass from Kyle Rowley (Taylor Rowan kick), Spokane 7–0
- Spokane – (6:20) Shaun Kauleinamoku 22-yard pass from Kyle Rowley (Taylor Rowan kick), Spokane 14–0
- Orlando – (4:22) Josh Bush 37-yard pass from Nick Hill (Mark Lewis kick), Spokane 14–7
- Spokane – (0:16) Raul Vijil 9-yard pass from Kyle Rowley (Taylor Rowan kick), Spokane 21–7

2nd quarter

- Orlando – (10:52) Kenny McEntyre 11-yard interception return (Mark Lewis kick), Spokane 21–14
- Orlando – (4:19) Josh Bush 1-yard pass from Nick Hill (Mark Lewis kick), Tied 21–21
- Spokane – (2:07) Raul Vijil 3-yard pass from Kyle Rowley (Taylor Rowan kick), Spokane 28–21
- Orlando – (0:23) Nick Hill 3-yard run (Mark Lewis kick), Tied 28–28
- Spokane – (0:13) Raul Vijil 41-yard pass from Kyle Rowley (Taylor Rowan kick), Spokane 35–28

3rd quarter

- Orlando – (12:24) Mark Lewis 31-yard field goal, Spokane 35–31
- Spokane – (9:28) Raul Vijil 8-yard pass from Kyle Rowley (Taylor Rowan kick), Spokane 42–31
- Orlando – (4:32) Josh Bush 24-yard pass from Nick Hill (Mark Lewis kick), Spokane 42–38
- Spokane – (0:00) Shaun Kauleinamoku 17-yard pass from Kyle Rowley (Taylor Rowan kick), Spokane 49–38

4th quarter

- Spokane – (11:14) Kyle Rowley 1-yard run (Taylor Rowan kick), Spokane 56–38
- Orlando – (7:36) Nick Hill 30-yard run (Mark Lewis kick), Spokane 56–45
- Spokane – (5:32) Raul Vijil 1-yard pass from Kyle Rowley (Taylor Rowan kick), Spokane 63–45
- Orlando – (1:18) James Lynch 1-yard run (Mark Lewis kick), Spokane 63–52
- Spokane – (0:44) Kyle Rowley 1-yard run (Taylor Rowan kick), Spokane 70–52
- Orlando – (0:07) Doug Gabriel 8-yard pass from Nick Hill (Nick Hill pass failed), Spokane 70–52

Passing

- Spokane – Kyle Rowley: 23/32, 293 yards, 8 TD, 1 INT
- Orlando – Nick Hill: 23/41, 299 yards, 4 TD

Rushing

- Spokane – Kyle Rowley: 4 att, 5 yards, 2 TD
- Orlando – Nick Hill: 6 att, 57 yards, 2 TD

Receiving

- Spokane – Raul Vijil: 7 rec, 88 yards, 5 TD
- Orlando – Josh Bush: 11 rec, 162 yards, 3 TD

=== Week 8: at Jacksonville Sharks ===
Week 8: Orlando Predators at Jacksonville Sharks – Game summary

Quarter	1	2	3	4	Total
Predators	14	21	7	13	55
Sharks	7	33	14	22	76

at Jacksonville Veterans Memorial Arena, Jacksonville, Florida

- Date: April 30
- Game time: 8:00 p.m. EDT
- Game attendance: 10,150
- Referee: Chris Snead
- Recap

Game information

1st quarter

- Jacksonville – (11:49) Jeron Harvey 9-yard run (Marco Capozzoli kick), Jacksonville 7–0
- Orlando – (7:39) Bobby Sippio 6-yard pass from Nick Hill (Mark Lewis kick), Tied 7–7
- Orlando – (3:01) Bobby Sippio 41-yard pass from Nick Hill (Mark Lewis kick), Orlando 14–7

2nd quarter

- Jacksonville – (12:38) Jeron Harvey 5-yard pass from Aaron Garcia (Marco Capozzoli kick failed), Orlando 14–13
- Orlando – (9:59) Josh Bush 26-yard pass from Nick Hill (Mark Lewis kick), Orlando 21–13
- Jacksonville – (6:48) Jomo Wilson 31-yard pass from Aaron Garcia (Marco Capozzoli kick), Orlando 21–20
- Jacksonville – (3:50) Jeron Harvey 9-yard pass from Aaron Garcia (Marco Capozzoli kick), Jacksonville 27–21
- Jacksonville – (1:00) Charles Hunt 26-yard interception return (Marco Capozzoli kick), Jacksonville 34–21
- Orlando – (0:55) James Lynch 2-yard run (Mark Lewis kick), Jacksonville 34–28
- Jacksonville – (0:38) Sale Key 41-yard pass from Aaron Garcia (Jeff Hughley rush failed), Jacksonville 40–28
- Orlando – (0:00) Bobby Sippio 9-yard pass from Nick Hill (Mark Lewis kick), Jacksonville 40–35

3rd quarter

- Orlando – (10:15) Josh Bush 9-yard pass from Nick Hill (Mark Lewis kick), Orlando 42–40
- Jacksonville – (4:50) Jomo Wilson 12-yard pass from Aaron Garcia (Marco Capozzoli kick), Jacksonville 47–42
- Jacksonville – (2:42) Jomo Wilson 10-yard pass from Aaron Garcia (Marco Capozzoli kick), Jacksonville 54–42

4th quarter

- Jacksonville – (13:53) Kirby Griffin 3-yard run (Marco Capozzoli kick), Jacksonville 61–42
- Jacksonville – (10:05) Jeff Hughley 8-yard fumble recovery (Marco Capozzoli kick failed), Jacksonville 67–42
- Jacksonville – (9:39) Team safety, Jacksonville 69–42
- Orlando – (4:47) Josh Bush 19-yard pass from Nick Hill (Mark Lewis kick), Jacksonville 69–49
- Jacksonville – (2:38) Kirby Griffin 4-yard run (Marco Capozzoli kick), Jacksonville 76–49
- Orlando – (0:22) Nick Hill 2-yard run (Nick Hill pass intercepted), Jacksonville 76–55

Passing

- Orlando – Nick Hill: 24/39, 266 yards, 6 TD, 2 INT
- Jacksonville – Aaron Garcia: 19/31, 274 yards, 6 TD, 2 INT

Rushing

- Orlando – Nick Hill: 6 att, 22 yards, 1 TD
- Jacksonville – Kirby Griffin: 3 att, 38 yards, 2 TD

Receiving

- Orlando – T.T. Toliver: 9 rec, 127 yards, 3 TD
- Jacksonville – Jeron Harvey: 7 rec, 105 yards, 2 TD

=== Week 9: vs. Tampa Bay Storm ===
Week 9: Tampa Bay Storm at Orlando Predators – Game summary

Quarter	1	2	3	4	Total
Storm	14	7	14	26	61
Predators	14	21	6	22	63

at Amway Center, Orlando, Florida

- Date: May 6
- Game time: 8:00 p.m. EDT
- Game attendance: 12,897
- Referee: Scott Vaughn
- Recap

Game information

1st quarter

- Tampa Bay – (12:35) Michael Lindsey 2-yard run (Kyle Chilton kick), Tampa Bay 7–0
- Orlando – (10:41) T.T. Toliver 27-yard pass from Nick Hill (Mark Lewis kick), Tied 7–7
- Orlando – (6:59) Bobby Sippio 2-yard pass from Nick Hill (Mark Lewis kick), Orlando 14–7
- Tampa Bay – (1:34) Terrence Royal 1-yard run (Kyle Chilton kick), Tied 14–14

2nd quarter

- Orlando – (13:14) T.T. Toliver 15-yard pass from Nick Hill (Mark Lewis kick), Orlando 21–14
- Orlando – (6:40) Robert Quiroga 5-yard pass from Nick Hill (Mark Lewis kick), Orlando 28–14
- Tampa Bay – (2:37) Terrence Royal 1-yard run (Kyle Chilton kick), Orlando 28–21
- Orlando – (0:07) Nick Hill 7-yard run (Mark Lewis kick), Orlando 35–21

3rd quarter

- Tampa Bay – (9:44) Huey Whittaker 4-yard pass from Brian Zbydniewski (Kyle Chilton kick), Orlando 35–28
- Tampa Bay – (8:15) Huey Whittaker 0-yard net recovery (Kyle Chilton kick), Tied 35–35
- Orlando – (7:47) T.T. Toliver 39-yard pass from Nick Hill (Mark Lewis kick failed), Orlando 41–35

4th quarter

- Orlando – (13:31) Josh Bush 9-yard pass from Nick Hill (Nick Hill pass), Orlando 49–35
- Tampa Bay – (12:09) Amari Jackson 10-yard pass from Brian Zbydniewski (Kyle Chilton kick), Orlando 49–42
- Orlando – (7:06) Josh Bush 6-yard pass from Nick Hill (Mark Lewis kick), Orlando 56–42
- Tampa Bay – (6:08) Amari Jackson 10-yard fumble recovery (Kyle Chilton kick failed), Orlando 56–48
- Orlando – (4:05) Bobby Sippio 26-yard pass from Nick Hill (Mark Lewis kick), Orlando 63–48
- Tampa Bay – (2:47) Amari Jackson 32-yard pass from Brian Zbydniewski (Brian Zbydniewski pass failed), Orlando 63–54
- Tampa Bay – (0:12) Huey Whittaker 9-yard pass from Brian Zbydniewski (Kyle Chilton kick), Orlando 63–61

Passing

- Tampa Bay – Brian Zbydniewski: 26/39, 304 yards, 4 TD, 3 INT
- Orlando – Nick Hill: 24/37, 323 yards, 8 TD, 1 INT

Rushing

- Tampa Bay – Terrence Royal: 3 att, 6 yards, 2 TD
- Orlando – Nick Hill: 5 att, 26 yards, 1 TD

Receiving

- Tampa Bay – Amari Jackson: 10 rec, 146 yards, 2 TD
- Orlando – T.T. Toliver: 9 rec, 140 yards, 3 TD

=== Week 10: vs. Cleveland Gladiators ===
Week 10: Cleveland Gladiators at Orlando Predators – Game summary

Quarter	1	2	3	4	Total
Gladiators	0	7	13	6	26
Predators	14	14	7	21	56

at Amway Center, Orlando, Florida

- Date: May 14
- Game time: 7:30 p.m. EDT
- Game attendance: 11,256
- Referee: Alex Kemp
- Recap

Game information

1st quarter

- Orlando – (10:29) T.T. Toliver 25-yard pass from Nick Hill (Mark Lewis kick), Orlando 7–0
- Orlando – (8:23) Nick Hill 6-yard run (Mark Lewis kick), Orlando 14–0

2nd quarter

- Cleveland – (13:55) Dominick Goodman 23-yard pass from Dan Whalen (Matt Denny kick), Orlando 14–7
- Orlando – (10:47) Robert Quiroga 16-yard pass from Nick Hill (Mark Lewis kick), Orlando 21–7
- Orlando – (0:10) Nick Hill 14-yard run (Mark Lewis kick), Orlando 28–7

3rd quarter

- Cleveland – (8:18) Troy Bergeron 5-yard pass from Dan Whalen (Matt Denny kick), Orlando 28–14
- Orlando – (4:23) Robert Quiroga 7-yard pass from Nick Hill (Mark Lewis kick), Orlando 35–14
- Cleveland – (1:30) Dan Whalen 2-yard run (Matt Denny kick blocked), Orlando 35–20

4th quarter

- Orlando – (14:14) Josh Bush 37-yard pass from Nick Hill (Mark Lewis kick), Orlando 42–20
- Cleveland – (11:19) Robert Redd 42-yard pass from Dan Whalen (Dan Whalen pass failed), Orlando 42–26
- Orlando – (8:03) Robert Quiroga 19-yard pass from Nick Hill (Mark Lewis kick), Orlando 49–26
- Orlando – (2:41) Josh Bush 2-yard pass from Nick Hill (Mark Lewis kick), Orlando 56–26

Passing

- Cleveland – Dan Whalen: 14/29, 200 yards, 3 TD
- Orlando – Nick Hill: 23/29, 267 yards, 6 TD

Rushing

- Cleveland – Dan Whalen: 5 att, 19 yards, 1 TD
- Orlando – Nick Hill: 5 att, 23 yards, 2 TD

Receiving

- Cleveland – Dominick Goodman: 7 rec, 114 yards, 1 TD
- Orlando – Josh Bush: 6 rec, 75 yards, 2 TD

=== Week 12: at Milwaukee Mustangs ===
Week 12: Orlando Predators at Milwaukee Mustangs – Game summary

Quarter	1	2	3	4	Total
Predators	7	0	14	14	35
Mustangs	6	0	10	14	30

at Bradley Center, Milwaukee, Wisconsin

- Date: May 26
- Game time: 8:00 p.m. EDT
- Game attendance: 3,348
- Referee: Tony Cannella
- Recap

Game information

1st quarter

- Milwaukee – (9:16) Garrett Lindholm 22-yard field goal, Milwaukee 3–0
- Milwaukee – (3:06) Garrett Lindholm 21-yard field goal, Milwaukee 6–0
- Orlando – (2:36) T.T. Toliver 18-yard pass from Nick Hill (Mark Lewis kick), Orlando 7–6

2nd quarter

No scoring

3rd quarter

- Milwaukee – (13:38) Kelvin Rodgers 35-yard interception return (Garrett Lindholm kick), Milwaukee 13–7
- Orlando – (10:49) Jamarr Ward 1-yard run (Mark Lewis kick), Orlando 14–13
- Milwaukee – (4:18) Garrett Lindholm 29-yard field goal, Milwaukee 16–14
- Orlando – (2:03) Robert Quiroga 30-yard pass from Nick Hill (Mark Lewis kick), Orlando 21–16

4th quarter

- Milwaukee – (13:20) Damian Harrell 20-yard pass from R.J. Archer (R.J. Archer pass), Milwaukee 24–21
- Orlando – (10:03) T.T. Toliver 8-yard pass from Nick Hill (Mark Lewis kick), Orlando 28–24
- Orlando – (3:28) Bobby Sippio 5-yard pass from Nick Hill (Mark Lewis kick), Orlando 35–24
- Milwaukee – (0:50) Marcus Everett 5-yard pass from R.J. Archer, Orlando 35–30

Passing

- Orlando – Nick Hill: 15/26, 224 yards, 4 TD, 3 INT
- Milwaukee – R.J. Archer: 21/43, 183 yards, 2 TD, 3 INT

Rushing

- Orlando – Nick Hill: 5 att, 26 yards
- Milwaukee – Mykel Benson: 5 att, 18 yards

Receiving

- Orlando – Robert Quiroga: 7 rec, 121 yards, 1 TD
- Milwaukee – Damian Harrell: 9 rec, 100 yards, 1 TD

=== Week 13: at Iowa Barnstormers ===
Week 13: Orlando Predators at Iowa Barnstormers – Game summary

Quarter	1	2	3	4	Total
Predators	16	20	21	20	77
Barnstormers	0	20	14	27	61

at Wells Fargo Arena, Des Moines, Iowa

- Date: June 4
- Game time: 8:05 p.m. EDT
- Game attendance: 8,279
- Referee: Shane Anderson
- Recap

Game information

1st quarter

- Orlando – (9:08) Team safety, Orlando 2–0
- Orlando – (7:25) Josh Bush 3-yard run (Mark Lewis kick), Orlando 9–0
- Orlando – (0:18) Bobby Sippio 19-yard pass from Nick Hill (Mark Lewis kick), Orlando 16–0

2nd quarter

- Iowa – (13:06) Team safety, Orlando 16–2
- Iowa – (12:05) Marquis Hamilton 14-yard pass from Brad Banks (Nick Pertuit kick blocked), Orlando 16–8
- Orlando – (8:12) Bobby Sippio 10-yard pass from Nick Hill (Mark Lewis kick failed), Orlando 22–8
- Orlando – (4:04) Bobby Sippio 7-yard pass from Nick Hill (Mark Lewis kick), Orlando 29–8
- Orlando – (2:24) Andy Dorcely 0-yard net recovery (Mark Lewis kick), Orlando 36–8
- Iowa – (0:39) Brad Banks 2-yard run (Nick Pertuit kick failed), Orlando 36–14
- Iowa – (0:00) Jesse Schmidt 12-yard pass from Brad Banks (Brad Banks pass failed), Orlando 36–20

3rd quarter

- Orlando – (12:25) T.T. Toliver 16-yard pass from Nick Hill (Mark Lewis kick), Orlando 43–20
- Iowa – (11:04) Rodney Filer 35-yard run (Nick Pertuit kick), Orlando 43–27
- Orlando – (9:21) Bobby Sippio 6-yard pass from Nick Hill (Mark Lewis kick), Orlando 50–27
- Orlando – (4:46) Bobby Sippio 45-yard pass from Nick Hill (Mark Lewis kick), Orlando 57–27
- Iowa – (3:44) Cameron McGlenn 47-yard kickoff return (Nick Pertuit kick), Orlando 57–34

4th quarter

- Orlando – (12:18) Bobby Sippio 11-yard pass from Nick Hill (Mark Lewis kick failed), Orlando 63–34
- Iowa – (11:00) Jesse Schmidt 40-yard pass from Bryan Lee-Lauduski (Nick Pertuit kick), Orlando 63–41
- Iowa – (7:43) Jesse Schmidt 3-yard pass from Bryan Lee-Lauduski (Nick Pertuit kick), Orlando 63–48
- Orlando – (4:06) Josh Bush 17-yard pass from Nick Hill (Mark Lewis kick), Orlando 70–48
- Iowa – (0:57) Marquis Hamilton 4-yard pass from Bryan Lee-Lauduski (Bryan Lee-Lauduski pass failed), Orlando 70–54
- Orlando – (0:14) Rayshaun Kizer 30-yard interception return (Mark Lewis kick), Orlando 77–54
- Iowa – (0:03) Tommy Ellingworth 36-yard pass from Bryan Lee-Lauduski (Nick Pertuit kick), Orlando 77–61

Passing

- Orlando – Nick Hill: 24/34, 295 yards, 8 TD, 1 INT
- Iowa – Brian Banks: 13/25, 142 yards, 2 TD, 4 INT

Rushing

- Orlando – Nick Hill: 6 att, 56 yards
- Iowa – Rodney Filer: 2 att, 36 yards, 1 TD

Receiving

- Orlando – Bobby Sippio: 9 rec, 124 yards, 6 TD
- Iowa – Jesse Schmidt: 7 rec, 114 yards, 3 TD

=== Week 14: vs. Jacksonville Sharks ===
Week 14: Jacksonville Sharks at Orlando Predators – Game summary

Quarter	1	2	3	4	Total
Sharks	14	26	14	14	68
Predators	13	20	14	20	67

at Amway Center, Orlando, Florida

- Date: June 11
- Game time: 7:30 p.m. EDT
- Game attendance: 12,356
- Referee: Scott Vaughn
- Recap

Game information

1st quarter

- Jacksonville – (11:28) Jomo Wilson 21-yard pass from Aaron Garcia (Marco Capozzoli kick), Jacksonville 7–0
- Orlando – (9:47) Bobby Sippio 12-yard pass from Nick Hill (Mark Lewis kick failed), Jacksonville 7–6
- Jacksonville – (5:05) Jeron Harvey 3-yard pass from Aaron Garcia (Marco Capozzoli kick), Jacksonville 14–6
- Orlando – (0:09) T.T. Toliver 3-yard pass from Nick Hill (Mark Lewis kick), Jacksonville 14–13

2nd quarter

- Jacksonville – (9:28) Jeron Harvey 39-yard pass from Aaron Garcia (Marco Capozzoli kick), Jacksonville 21–13
- Orlando – (6:50) Bobby Sippio 19-yard pass from Nick Hill (Mark Lewis kick failed), Jacksonville 21–19
- Jacksonville – (4:22) Jeron Harvey 34-yard pass from Aaron Garcia (Marco Capozzoli kick failed), Jacksonville 27–19
- Orlando – (0:56) T.T. Toliver 22-yard pass from Nick Hill (Mark Lewis kick), Jacksonville 27–26
- Jacksonville – (0:46) Sale' Key 16-yard pass from Aaron Garcia (Marco Capozzoli kick failed), Jacksonville 33–26
- Orlando – (0:38) Bobby Sippio 4-yard pass from Nick Hill (Mark Lewis kick), Tied 33–33
- Jacksonville – (0:15) Jomo Wilson 11-yard pass from Aaron Garcia (Marco Capozzoli kick), Jacksonville 40–33

3rd quarter

- Jacksonville – (11:34) Sale' Key 10-yard pass from Aaron Garcia (Marco Capozzoli kick), Jacksonville 47–33
- Orlando – (8:43) Bobby Sippio 14-yard pass from Nick Hill (Mark Lewis kick), Jacksonville 47–40
- Jacksonville – (5:01) Jeron Harvey 4-yard run (Marco Capozzoli kick), Jacksonville 54–40
- Orlando – (0:50) Robert Quiroga 9-yard pass from Nick Hill (Mark Lewis kick), Jacksonville 54–47

4th quarter

- Jacksonville – (12:26) Jeron Harvey 7-yard pass from Aaron Garcia (Marco Capozzoli kick), Jacksonville 61–47
- Orlando – (7:49) Josh Bush 22-yard pass from Nick Hill (Mark Lewis kick), Jacksonville 61–54
- Orlando – (0:52) James Lynch 1-yard run (Mark Lewis kick), Tied 61–61
- Jacksonville – (0:23) Jamark Simmons 1-yard run (Marco Capozzoli kick), Jacksonville 68–61
- Orlando – (0:07) T.T. Toliver 33-yard pass from Nick Hill (Mark Lewis pass failed), Jacksonville 68–67

Passing

- Jacksonville – Aaron Garcia: 24/38, 329 yards, 8 TD
- Orlando – Nick Hill: 25/42, 361 yards, 9 TD, 1 INT

Rushing

- Jacksonville – Jeron Harvey: 1 att, 4 yards, 1 TD
- Orlando – Nick Hill: 5 att, 21 yards

Receiving

- Jacksonville – Jeron Harvey: 10 rec, 145 yards, 4 TD
- Orlando – T.T. Toliver: 9 rec, 134 yards, 3 TD

=== Week 15: at Tampa Bay Storm ===
Week 15: Orlando Predators at Tampa Bay Storm – Game summary

Quarter	1	2	3	4	Total
Predators	7	9	7	21	44
Storm	12	20	7	7	46

at St. Pete Times Forum, Tampa, Florida

- Date: June 17
- Game time: 8:00 p.m. EDT
- Game attendance: 11,151
- Referee: Tom McCabe
- Recap

Game information

1st quarter

- Tampa Bay – (7:06) Amarri Jackson 4-yard pass from Brian Zbydniewski (Kyle Chilton rush fumbled), Tampa Bay 6–0
- Orlando – (5:16) T.T. Toliver 39-yard pass from Nick Hill (Mark Lewis kick), Orlando 7–6
- Tampa Bay – (3:58) Amarri Jackson 36-yard pass from Brian Zbydniewski (Kyle Chilton kick blocked), Tampa Bay 12–7

2nd quarter

- Tampa Bay – (14:55) Amarri Jackson 30-yard pass from Brian Zbydniewski (Kyle Chilton kick), Tampa Bay 19–7
- Tampa Bay – (13:31) Erick McIntosh 18-yard interception return (Kyle Chilton kick), Tampa Bay 26–7
- Orlando – (9:50) Travis Coleman 5-yard pass from Nick Hill (Mark Lewis kick), Tampa Bay 26–14
- Tampa Bay – (7:42) Huey Whittaker 3-yard pass from Brian Zbydniewski (Kyle Chilton kick blocked), Tampa Bay 32–14
- Orlando – (7:42) Kenny McEntyre PAT return, Tampa Bay 32–16

3rd quarter

- Tampa Bay – (11:25) Amarri Jackson 8-yard pass from Brian Zbydniewski (Kyle Chilton kick), Tampa Bay 39–16
- Orlando – (8:42) Robert Quiroga 9-yard pass from Nick Hill (Mark Lewis kick), Tampa Bay 39–23

4th quarter

- Orlando – (12:49) Josh Bosh 20-yard pass from Nick Hill (Mark Lewis kick), Tampa Bay 39–30
- Orlando – (6:46) T.T. Toliver 29-yard pass from Nick Hill (Mark Lewis kick), Tampa Bay 39–37
- Tampa Bay – (4:24) Amarri Jackson 18-yard pass from Brian Zbydniewski (Kyle Chilton kick), Tampa Bay 46–37
- Orlando – (0:56) Robert Quiroga 2-yard pass from Nick Hill (Mark Lewis kick), Tampa Bay 46–44

Passing

- Orlando – Nick Hill: 25/37, 268 yards, 6 TD, 2 INT
- Tampa Bay – Brian Zbydniewski: 19/32, 231 yards, 6 TD, 2 INT

Rushing

- Orlando – Nick Hill: 3 att, 21 yards
- Tampa Bay – Brian Zbydniewski: 1 att, 1 yard

Receiving

- Orlando – T.T. Toliver: 9 rec, 150 yards, 2 TD
- Tampa Bay – Amari Jackson: 11 rec, 151 yards, 5 TD

=== Week 16: vs. Georgia Force ===
Week 16: Georgia Force at Orlando Predators – Game summary

Quarter	1	2	3	4	Total
Force	3	23	10	28	64
Predators	7	7	6	14	34

at Amway Center, Orlando, Florida

- Date: June 25
- Game time: 7:30 p.m. EDT
- Game attendance: 11,364
- Referee: Kevin Stein
- Recap

Game information

1st quarter

- Orlando – (13:26) Bobby Sippio 3-yard pass from Nick Hill (Mark Lewis kick), Orlando 7–0
- Georgia – (7:07) Carlos Martinez 36-yard field goal, Orlando 7–3

2nd quarter

- Georgia – (14:09) Maurice Purify 1-yard pass from Brett Elliott (Carlos Martinez kick), Georgia 10–7
- Orlando – (13:09) T.T. Toliver 18-yard pass from Nick Hill (Mark Lewis kick), Orlando 14–10
- Georgia – (0:32) Lance Ancar 1-yard run (Carlos Martinez kick), Georgia 17–14
- Georgia – (0:23) Team safety, Georgia 19–14
- Georgia – (0:11) Maurice Purify 41-yard pass from Brett Elliott (Carlos Martinez kick), Georgia 26–14

3rd quarter

- Georgia – (12:24) Maurice Purify 15-yard pass from Brett Elliott (Carlos Martinez kick), Georgia 33–14
- Orlando – (10:40) Robert Quiroga 8-yard pass from Nick Hill (Mark Lewis kick blocked), Georgia 33–20
- Georgia – (3:08) Carlos Martinez 30-yard field goal, Georgia 36–20

4th quarter

- Georgia – (13:17) Larry Shipp 13-yard pass from Brett Elliott (Carlos Martinez kick), Georgia 43–20
- Orlando – (9:57) T.T. Toliver 7-yard run (Mark Lewis kick), Georgia 43–27
- Georgia – (9:45) Caleb Bostic 9-yard kickoff return (Carlos Martinez kick), Georgia 50–27
- Georgia – (5:13) Larry Shipp 48-yard pass from Brett Elliott (Carlos Martinez kick), Georgia 57–27
- Georgia – (2:25) Robert Durham 46-yard interception return (Carlos Martinez kick), Georgia 64–27
- Orlando – (0:50) Josh Bush 11-yard pass from Collin Drafts (Mark Lewis kick), Georgia 64–34

Passing

- Georgia – Brett Elliott: 18/29, 320 yards, 5 TD
- Orlando – Nick Hill: 21/33, 244 yards, 3 TD, 1 INT

Rushing

- Georgia – Brett Elliott: 1 att, 8 yards
- Orlando – T.T. Toliver: 2 att, 9 yards, 1 TD

Receiving

- Georgia – Larry Shipp: 6 rec, 152 yards, 2 TD
- Orlando – T.T. Toliver: 8 rec, 99 yards, 1 TD

=== Week 17: vs. Pittsburgh Power ===
Week 17: Pittsburgh Power at Orlando Predators – Game summary

Quarter	1	2	3	4	Total
Power	19	21	7	7	54
Predators	14	13	28	7	62

at Amway Center, Orlando, Florida

- Date: July 1
- Game time: 8:00 p.m. EDT
- Game attendance: 15,726
- Referee: Perry Havener
- Recap

Game information

1st quarter

- Pittsburgh – (13:15) D.J. Hall 10-yard pass from Bernard Morris (Paul Edinger kick), Pittsburgh 7–0
- Pittsburgh – (8:06) Irvin Campbell 38-yard pass from Bernard Morris (Paul Edinger kick failed), Pittsburgh 13–0
- Orlando – (7:29) Josh Bush 54-yard kickoff return (Mark Lewis kick), Pittsburgh 13–7
- Pittsburgh – (5:33) Michael Washington 29-yard pass from Bernard Morris (Paul Edinger kick failed), Pittsburgh 19–7
- Orlando – (1:28) Collin Drafts 10-yard run (Mark Lewis kick), Pittsburgh 19–14

2nd quarter

- Pittsburgh – (10:14) Joshua Rue 1-yard run (Paul Edinger kick), Pittsburgh 26–14
- Pittsburgh – (6:28) D.J. Hall 1-yard pass from Bernard Morris (Paul Edinger kick), Pittsburgh 33–14
- Orlando – (1:59) Robert Quiroga 36-yard pass from Collin Drafts (Mark Lewis kick failed), Pittsburgh 33–20
- Pittsburgh – (0:56) D.J. Hall 11-yard pass from Bernard Morris (Paul Edinger kick), Pittsburgh 40–20
- Orlando – (0:20) T.T. Toliver 4-yard pass from Collin Drafts (Mark Lewis kick), Pittsburgh 40–27

3rd quarter

- Orlando – (10:27) T.T. Toliver 6-yard pass from Collin Drafts (Mark Lewis kick), Pittsburgh 40–34
- Orlando – (9:15) Chris Dubalt 1-yard net recovery (Mark Lewis kick), Orlando 41–40
- Orlando – (8:23) Chris Dubalt 3-yard net recovery (Mark Lewis kick), Orlando 48–40
- Pittsburgh – (3:12) Lonnell Dewalt 10-yard pass from Bernard Morris (Paul Edinger kick), Orlando 48–47
- Orlando – (0:08) Josh Bush 8-yard pass from Collin Drafts (Mark Lewis kick), Orlando 55–47

4th quarter

- Pittsburgh – (8:52) Lonnell Dewalt 11-yard pass from Bernard Morris (Paul Edinger kick), Orlando 55–54
- Orlando – (2:05) Robert Quiroga 7-yard pass from Collin Drafts (Mark Lewis kick), Orlando 62–44

Passing

- Pittsburgh – Bernard Morris: 18/31, 237 yards, 7 TD, 1 INT
- Orlando – Collin Drafts: 23/34, 264 yards, 5 TD, 1 INT

Rushing

- Pittsburgh – Bernard Morris: 5 att, 59 yards
- Orlando – Collin Drafts: 4 att, 26 yards, 1 TD

Receiving

- Pittsburgh – D.J. Hall: 8 rec, 81 yards, 3 TD
- Orlando – Robert Quiroga: 6 rec, 64 yards, 2 TD

=== Week 18: at San Jose SaberCats ===
Week 18: Orlando Predators at San Jose SaberCats – Game summary

Quarter	1	2	3	4	Total
Predators	13	13	7	7	40
SaberCats	13	20	6	21	60

at HP Pavilion at San Jose, San Jose, California

- Date: July 9
- Game time: 10:30 p.m. EDT
- Game attendance: 10,302
- Referee: Dave Cutaia
- Recap

Game information

1st quarter

- San Jose – (13:45) James Roe 9-yard pass from Mark Grieb (Juan Gamboa kick), San Jose 7–0
- Orlando – (9:44) T.T. Toliver 8-yard pass from Collin Drafts (Mark Lewis kick failed), San Jose 7–6
- Orlando – (2:37) Collin Drafts 3-yard run (Mark Lewis kick), Orlando 13–7
- San Jose – (0:21) James Roe 9-yard pass from Mark Grieb (Juan Gamboa kick failed), Tied 13–13

2nd quarter

- Orlando – (14:25) Josh Bush 9-yard pass from Collin Drafts (Mark Lewis kick failed), Orlando 19–13
- San Jose – (11:13) Victor James 2-yard run (Juan Gamboa kick), San Jose 20–19
- Orlando – (8:55) T.T. Toliver 35-yard pass from Collin Drafts (Mark Lewis kick), Orlando 26–20
- San Jose – (5:31) Chad Cook 2-yard run (Juan Gamboa kick failed), Tied 26–26
- San Jose – (0:14) Chad Cook 10-yard run (Juan Gamboa kick), San Jose 33–26

3rd quarter

- Orlando – (9:36) T.T. Toliver 13-yard pass from Collin Drafts (Mark Lewis kick), Tied 33–33
- San Jose – (7:19) Ben Nelson 16-yard pass from Mark Grieb (Juan Gamboa kick failed), San Jose 39–33

4th quarter

- San Jose – (11:05) Victor James 5-yard run (Juan Gamboa kick), San Jose 46–33
- Orlando – (8:31) Robert Quiroga 40-yard pass from Collin Drafts (Mark Lewis kick), San Jose 46–40
- San Jose – (4:46) Mark Lewis 2-yard pass from Mark Grieb (Juan Gamboa kick), San Jose 53–40
- San Jose – (1:10) Ben Nelson 14-yard pass from Mark Grieb (Juan Gamboa kick), San Jose 60–40

Passing

- Orlando – Collin Drafts: 27/50, 313 yards, 5 TD
- San Jose – Mark Grieb: 26/32, 295 yards, 5 TD, 1 INT

Rushing

- Orlando – Collin Drafts: 4 att, 27 yards, 1 TD
- San Jose – Chad Cook: 5 att, 17 yards, 2 TD

Receiving

- Orlando – Jomo Wilson: 9 rec, 127 yards, 1 TD
- San Jose – Ben Nelson: 7 rec, 87 yards, 2 TD

=== Week 19: at Tulsa Talons ===
Week 19: Orlando Predators at Tulsa Talons – Game summary

Quarter	1	2	3	4	Total
Predators	14	28	21	22	85
Talons	14	7	14	14	49

at BOK Center, Tulsa, Oklahoma

- Date: July 16
- Game time: 8:00 p.m. EDT
- Game attendance: 6,166
- Referee: Chris Snead
- Recap

Game information

1st quarter

- Tulsa – (11:30) Al Hunt 4-yard pass from Justin Allgood (Juan Bongarra kick), Tulsa 7–0
- Orlando – (9:28) Bobby Sippio 2-yard run (Mark Lewis kick), Tied 7–7
- Orlando – (5:35) Bobby Sippio 6-yard run (Mark Lewis kick), Orlando 14–7
- Tulsa – (3:06) Troy McBroom 29-yard pass from Justin Allgood (Juan Bongarra kick), Tied 14–14

2nd quarter

- Orlando – (13:10) Robert Quiroga 10-yard pass from Nick Hill (Mark Lewis kick), Orlando 21–14
- Tulsa – (9:33) Al Hunt 7-yard pass from Justin Allgood (Juan Bongarra kick), Tied 21–21
- Orlando – (3:53) Robert Quiroga 9-yard pass from Nick Hill (Mark Lewis kick), Orlando 28–21
- Orlando – (0:30) Robert Quiroga 7-yard pass from Nick Hill (Mark Lewis kick), Orlando 35–21
- Orlando – (0:19) Rayshaun Kizer 17-yard interception return (Mark Lewis kick), Orlando 42–21

3rd quarter

- Orlando – (10:22) Robert Quiroga 5-yard pass from Nick Hill (Mark Lewis kick), Orlando 49–21
- Tulsa – (7:27) Craig Fulton 4-yard run (Juan Bongarra kick), Orlando 49–28
- Orlando – (5:45) T.T. Toliver 7-yard pass from Nick Hill (Mark Lewis kick), Orlando 56–28
- Tulsa – (3:02) Bobby Reid 36-yard run (Juan Bongarra kick), Orlando 56–35
- Orlando – (1:05) Bobby Sippio 35-yard pass from Nick Hill (Mark Lewis kick), Orlando 63–35

4th quarter

- Orlando – (14:51) Team safety, Orlando 65–35
- Tulsa – (13:38) Team safety, Orlando 65–37
- Orlando – (8:10) Bobby Sippio 31-yard pass from Nick Hill (Mark Lewis kick), Orlando 72–37
- Orlando – (6:30) Josh Bush 0-yard fumble recovery (Mark Lewis kick), Orlando 79–37
- Tulsa – (5:40) Bobby Reid 3-yard run (Juan Bongarra kick failed), Orlando 79–43
- Orlando – (5:02) Josh Bush 57-yard kickoff return (Mark Lewis kick failed), Orlando 85–43
- Tulsa – (2:28) J.J. Payne 10-yard run (Juan Bongarra kick failed), Orlando 85–49

Passing

- Orlando – Nick Hill: 33/42, 345 yards, 8 TD
- Tulsa – Justin Allgood: 18/24, 233 yards, 3 TD, 2 INT

Rushing

- Orlando – Bobby Sippio: 1 att, 2 yards, 1 TD
- Tulsa – Bobby Reid: 3 att, 43 yards, 2 TD

Receiving

- Orlando – Bobby Sippio: 12 rec, 167 yards, 3 TD
- Tulsa – Al Hunt: 8 rec, 114 yards, 2 TD

=== Week 20: vs. New Orleans VooDoo ===
Week 20: New Orleans VooDoo at Orlando Predators – Game summary

Quarter	1	2	3	4	Total
VooDoo	6	12	6	20	44
Predators	7	28	13	14	62

at Amway Center, Orlando, Florida

- Date: July 23
- Game time: 7:30 p.m. EDT
- Game attendance: 14,982
- Referee: Scott Vaughn
- Recap

Game information

1st quarter

- New Orleans – (6:45) Tom Taggart 6-yard run (Chris Maraviglia kick failed), New Orleans 6–0
- Orlando – (1:27) Bobby Sippio 10-yard pass from Nick Hill (Mark Lewis kick), Orlando 7–6

2nd quarter

- New Orleans – (14:57) P.J. Berry 9-yard pass from Danny Wimprine (Chris Maraviglia kick failed), New Orleans 12–7
- Orlando – (12:28) Bobby Sippio 13-yard pass from Nick Hill (Mark Lewis kick), Orlando 14–12
- Orlando – (6:07) Marlon Moye-Moore 1-yard run (Mark Lewis kick), Orlando 21–12
- New Orleans – (4:23) P.J. Berry 23-yard pass from Danny Wimprine (Danny Wimprine pass failed), Orlando 21–18
- Orlando – (1:15) T.T. Toliver 3-yard pass from Nick Hill (Mark Lewis kick), Orlando 28–18
- Orlando – (0:04) Bobby Sippio 3-yard pass from Nick Hill (Mark Lewis kick), Orlando 35–18

3rd quarter

- Orlando – (12:53) Bobby Sippio 5-yard pass from Nick Hill (Mark Lewis kick), Orlando 42–18
- New Orleans – (7:17) Danny Wimprine 1-yard run (Danny Wimprine pass failed), Orlando 42–24
- Orlando – (5:27) Robert Quiroga 33-yard pass from Nick Hill (Mark Lewis kick failed), Orlando 48–24

4th quarter

- New Orleans – (13:52) Carlese Franklin 0-yard fumble recovery (Danny Wimprine pass), Orlando 48–32
- Orlando – (12:37) Robert Quiroga 8-yard pass from Nick Hill (Mark Lewis kick), Orlando 55–32
- New Orleans – (7:41) Alvin Jackson 27-yard interception return (Danny Wimprine pass failed), Orlando 55–38
- New Orleans – (0:55) P.J. Berry 12-yard run (Danny Wimprine pass failed), Orlando 55–44
- Orlando – (0:41) T.T. Toliver 3-yard run (Mark Lewis kick), Orlando 62–44

Passing

- New Orleans – Danny Wimprine: 13/31, 159 yards, 2 TD, 3 INT
- Orlando – Nick Hill: 24/32, 296 yards, 7 TD, 1 INT

Rushing

- New Orleans – Tom Taggart: 7 att, 40 yards, 1 TD
- Orlando – Nick Hill: 4 att, 38 yards

Receiving

- New Orleans – P.J. Berry: 6 rec, 79 yards, 2 TD
- Orlando – Bobby Sippio: 14 rec, 166 yards, 4 TD

== Playoffs ==
=== American Conference Semifinals: at (1) Jacksonville Sharks ===
American Conference Semifinals: Orlando Predators at Jacksonville Sharks – Game summary

Quarter	1	2	3	4	Total
(4) Predators	7	13	7	21	48
(1) Sharks	14	14	14	21	63

at Jacksonville Veterans Memorial Arena, Jacksonville, Florida

- Date: July 29
- Game time: 8:00 p.m. EDT
- Game attendance: 10,189
- Recap

Game information

1st quarter

- Jacksonville – (15:00) Jeff Hughley 57 yd kickoff return (Marco Capozzoli kick), Jacksonville 7–0
- Orlando – (9:20) Nick Hill 10 yd run (Mark Lewis kick), Tied 7–7
- Jacksonville – (4:56) Jamarko Simmons 1 yd run (Marco Capozzoli kick), Jacksonville 14–7

2nd quarter

- Orlando – (13:38) Robert Quiroga 4 yd pass from Nick Hill (Mark Lewis kick), Jacksonville 14–13
- Jacksonville – (7:56) Jeron Harvey 4 yd pass from Aaron Garcia (Marco Capozzoli kick), Jacksonville 21–13
- Jacksonville – (2:59) Kirby Griffin 1 yd run (Marco Capozzoli kick), Jacksonville 28–13
- Orlando – (0:08) Bobby Sippio 13 yd pass from Nick Hill (Mark Lewis kick), Jacksonville 28–20

3rd quarter

- Orlando – (11:01) T.T. Toliver 11 yd pass from Nick Hill (Mark Lewis kick), Jacksonville 28–27
- Jacksonville – (10:03) Jeff Hughley 57 yd kickoff return (Marco Capozzoli kick), Jacksonville 35–27
- Jacksonville – (1:13) Jamarko Simmons 1 yd run (Marco Capozzoli kick), Jacksonville 42–27

4th quarter

- Jacksonville – (12:23) Jeron Harvey 10 yd pass from Aaron Garcia (Marco Capozzoli kick), Jacksonville 49–27
- Orlando – (7:48) Julius Wilson 3 yd pass from Nick Hill (Collin Drafts rush), Jacksonville 49–35
- Orlando – (5:42) T.T. Toliver 24 yd pass from Nick Hill (Mark Lewis kick), Jacksonville 49–42
- Jacksonville – (4:08) Jeron Harvey 11 yd pass from Aaron Garcia (Marco Capozzoli kick), Jacksonville 56–42
- Orlando – (2:23) T.T. Toliver 41 yd pass from Nick Hill (Mark Lewis kick failed), Jacksonville 56–48
- Jacksonville – (1:07) Jomo Wilson 17 yd pass from Aaron Garcia (Marco Capozzoli kick), Jacksonville 63–48

Passing

- Orlando – Nick Hill: 27/49, 311 yards, 6 TD, 2 INT
- Jacksonville – Aaron Garcia: 15/19, 148 yards, 4 TD, 1 INT

Rushing

- Orlando – Nick Hill: 3 att, 15 yards, 1 TD
- Jacksonville – Kirby Griffin: 8 att, 38 yards, 1 TD

Receiving

- Orlando – T.T. Toliver: 5 rec, 96 yards, 3 TD
- Jacksonville – Jomo Wilson: 7 rec, 72 yards, 1 TD
