= Amarri Jackson =

American football player (born 1985)

Profile
- Position: Wide receiver

Personal information
- Born: May 18, 1985 (age 41); Sarasota, Florida, U.S.
- Listed height: 6 ft 5 in (1.96 m)
- Listed weight: 215 lb (98 kg)

Career information
- High school: Riverview (Sarasota)
- College: Hillsborough C.C.; South Florida
- NFL draft: 2008: undrafted

Career history
- Tampa Bay Buccaneers (2008–2009)*; Tampa Bay Storm (2011–2012); Orlando Predators (2013); San Jose SaberCats (2013); Tampa Bay Storm (2014); Cleveland Gladiators (2015); Los Angeles KISS (2016)
- * Offseason or practice squad member only

Career AFL statistics
- Receptions: 448
- Yards: 5,748
- Touchdowns: 109
- Tackles: 30
- Returns-Yards-TDs: 92-1,793-4
- Stats at ArenaFan.com

Amarri Nathaniel Jackson (born May 18, 1985) is an American former professional football wide receiver who played in the National Football League (NFL) and Arena Football League (AFL). He played college football for the USF Bulls.

== Early life ==
Jackson attended Riverview High School, in Sarasota, Florida, where he earned four varsity letters in football, three in basketball and four in track. He was twice named an all-state basketball player while in high school.

== College career ==
He played college football at the University of South Florida from 2005 to 2007. In 2005, he led USF to a 45-14 win over Louisville with two rushing touchdowns on runs of 51 and 12 yards, a touchdown throw of 11 yards on a reverse, and two catches for 75 yards. He also had seven catches for 68 yards in a game against Rutgers in 2005. As a senior in 2007, Jackson started the first eight games of the season but missed the last four games due to an injury. He had six catches for 60 yards against Florida Atlantic and returned to the USF Bulls' lineup for the 2007 Sun Bowl.

Jackson was the subject of an oft-debated moment in USF's loss to Rutgers in 2007. With under a minute to go and the Bulls down 30-27 and facing a 4th and 22, quarterback Matt Grothe threw a pass to Jackson which he seemingly caught for a first down. The play was called back for offensive pass interference on Jackson, however, and the Bulls ended up losing, knocking them from #2 in the national rankings. The play, particularly whether or not the call on Jackson was correct, has since become a source of debate.

== Professional career ==
He has been signed twice by the Tampa Bay Buccaneers, first as an undrafted free agent in 2008 and again as a training camp invitee in 2009. He was released after preseason

=== San Jose SaberCats ===
On April 25, 2013, Jackson was traded to the San Jose SaberCats in exchange for Aaron Garcia and Devin Clark.

=== Tampa Bay Storm ===
On September 17, 2013, Jackson was traded by the SaberCats, along with Raymond McNeil, to the Storm for future considerations.

=== Cleveland Gladiators ===
On December 9, 2014, Jackson was assigned to the Cleveland Gladiators.

=== Los Angeles KISS ===
On December 9, 2015, Jackson was assigned to the Los Angeles KISS.
