= Devin Clark (American football) =

American football player (born 1986)

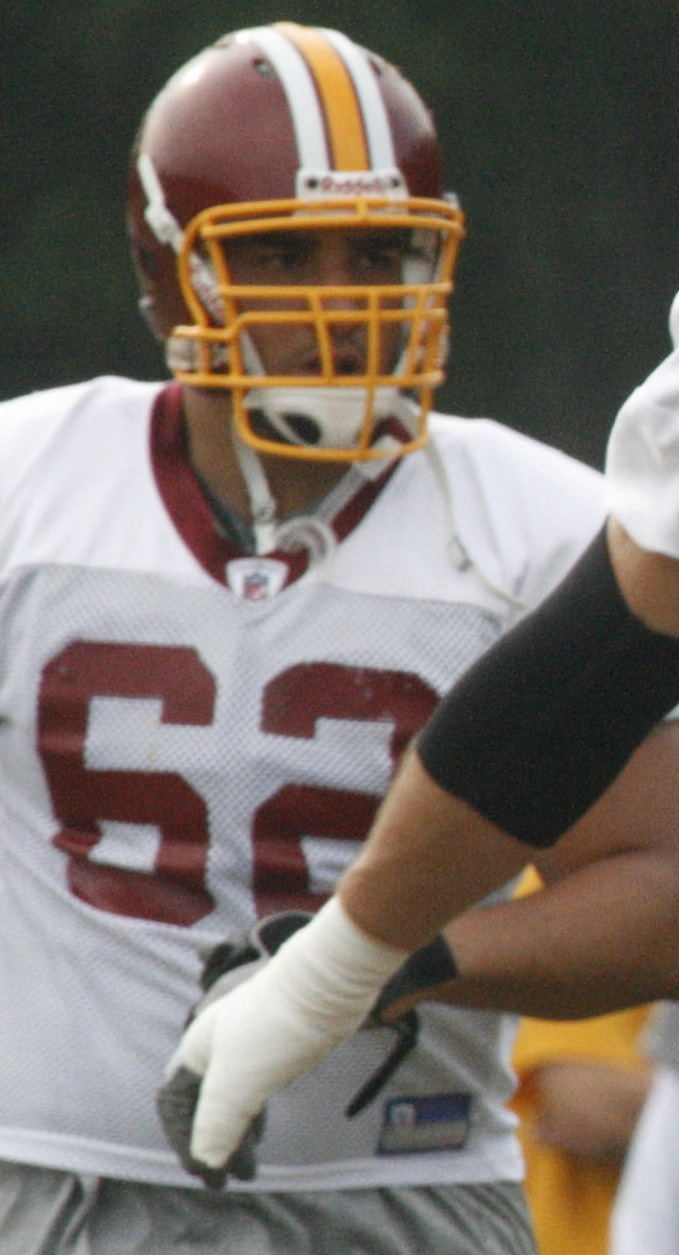
- Clark with the Washington Redskins in 2008

No. 77
- Position: Offensive tackle

Personal information
- Born: May 22, 1986 (age 40); Austin, Texas, U.S.
- Listed height: 6 ft 4 in (1.93 m)
- Listed weight: 317 lb (144 kg)

Career information
- College: New Mexico
- NFL draft: 2008: undrafted

Career history
- Washington Redskins (2008); New York Sentinels (2009)*; Spokane Shock (2010)*; Arizona Rattlers (2010–2011); Philadelphia Soul (2012)*; San Jose SaberCats (2013); Orlando Predators (2013)
- * Offseason or practice squad member only

Awards and highlights
- Second-team All-Arena (2011); First-team All-MW (2007)

Career NFL statistics
- Games played: 2
- Stats at Pro Football Reference

Career AFL statistics
- Receptions: 4
- Receiving yards: 49
- Tackles: 4
- Stats at ArenaFan.com

Devin Lane Clark (born May 22, 1986) is an American former professional football player who was an offensive tackle in the National Football League (NFL). He was signed by the Washington Redskins as an undrafted free agent in 2008. He played college football for the New Mexico Lobos.

Clark was also a member of the Spokane Shock, Arizona Rattlers, Philadelphia Soul, San Jose SaberCats, and Orlando Predators.

== Professional career ==
On December 16, 2009, it was reported by OSC that Devin Clark was added to the 2010 Spokane Shock roster. With head coach Rob Keefe stating "When you look at Devin Clark's film from the Redskins, you immediately notice his size and his strength." "At New Mexico, he was a major part of their offensive success and he really excelled in pass protection. With his size and his NFL experience he will be a real asset to our offensive line."

On April 25, 2013, Clark was traded, along with Aaron Garca, to the Orlando Predators in exchange for Amarri Jackson.
