= Derek Cassidy =

American football player (born 1986)

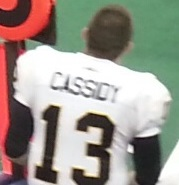
- Cassidy with the Pittsburgh Power in 2013

No. 13
- Position: Quarterback

Personal information
- Born: December 2, 1986 (age 39); Winter Haven, Florida, U.S.
- Listed height: 6 ft 2 in (1.88 m)
- Listed weight: 205 lb (93 kg)

Career information
- High school: Lake Region (Eagle Lake, Florida)
- College: Rhode Island (2005–2008)
- NFL draft: 2008: undrafted

Career history
- New Orleans VooDoo (2011); Columbus Lions (2012); Pittsburgh Power (2012–2013)

Career AFL statistics
- Comp. / Att.: 85 / 162
- Passing yards: 1,052
- TD–INT: 20–13
- QB rating: 70.29
- Rushing TDs: 3
- Stats at ArenaFan.com

Derek Winfield Cassidy (born December 2, 1986) is an American former professional football quarterback who played three seasons in the Arena Football League (AFL) for the New Orleans VooDoo and Pittsburgh Power. He played college football at for Rhode Island. He was also a member of the Columbus Lions of the Professional Indoor Football League (PIFL).

== Early life ==
Cassidy earned four varsity letters in both football and basketball at Lake Region High School in Eagle Lake, Florida. He was a three-year captain of the football team and two-year captain of the basketball squad. He was a three-time team MVP in football and team MVP in basketball as a senior. Cassidy also won the Slam Dunk Championship in the Florida Polk County All-Star Game. He helped the football team earn its first-ever appearance in the state playoffs as a sophomore in 2003 and the basketball team advance to the state semifinals his junior and senior years.

== College career ==
Cassidy played for the Rhode Island Rams from 2005 to 2008. He ranked third all-time in Rhode Island history with 5,005 career passing yards and 31 passing touchdowns. He completed 261 of 440 passes for 2,759 yards and 15 touchdowns his senior year.

== Professional career ==
Cassidy was assigned to the New Orleans VooDoo of the AFL on February 16, 2011. He completed 12 of 24 passes for 150 yards and one touchdown with three interceptions as a rookie. He was reassigned by the VooDoo on April 18, 2011.

Cassidy appeared in two games for the Columbus Lions of the PIFL in 2012, throwing one interception on two incomplete passes.

Cassidy was assigned to the Pittsburgh Power of the AFL on April 4, 2012. On April 14, 2012, the Power overcame a 48–17 deficit to defeat the Orlando Predators by a score of 57–54 in overtime, setting a new record for largest comeback in AFL history. Cassidy, who entered the game in the second quarter after an injury to Andrico Hines, completed the game-winning touchdown pass to Christian Wise. He completed 48 of 79 passes for 566 yards and 12 touchdowns with six interceptions in 2012. He played in six games for the Power in 2013, recording seven touchdowns and four interceptions.

=== AFL statistics ===
| Year | Team | Passing | | | | | | | Rushing | | |
| Year | Team | Cmp | Att | Pct | Yds | TD | Int | Rtg | Att | Yds | TD |
|---|---|---|---|---|---|---|---|---|---|---|---|
| 2011 | New Orleans | 12 | 24 | 50.0 | 150 | 1 | 3 | 40.62 | 0 | 0 | 0 |
| 2012 | Pittsburgh | 48 | 79 | 60.8 | 566 | 12 | 6 | 88.90 | 13 | 27 | 2 |
| 2013 | Pittsburgh | 25 | 59 | 42.4 | 336 | 7 | 4 | 62.54 | 4 | 30 | 1 |
| Career | | 85 | 162 | 52.5 | 1,052 | 20 | 13 | 70.29 | 17 | 57 | 3 |
