= McLeod Lake (disambiguation) =

McLeod Lake or Lake McLeod may refer to:

== Lakes ==
Canada

- McLeod Lake (Alberta), a lake in Alberta once known as Carson Lake

United States

- Lake McLeod (Florida), a lake in Polk County, Florida

== Other places ==
Canada

- McLeod Lake, British Columbia, an unincorporated community in British Columbia
