= Lake Region High School (Florida) =

Location
- 1995 Thunder Rd. Eagle Lake, Polk County, Florida 33839; United States; 27.979745°N 81.747205°W

Information
- School type: Public High School
- Founded: August 14, 1995
- Status: Open
- School district: Polk County Public Schools
- Principal: Amy Hardee
- Teaching staff: 58.00 (FTE)
- Grades: 9–12
- Gender: Co-ed
- Student to teacher ratio: 26.79
- Language: English
- Colors: Carolina Blue; Silver; Black
- Mascot: Horse
- Nickname: Thunder
- Yearbook: Legend
- Feeder schools: Westwood Middle School
- Website: lakeregionhigh.polkschoolsfl.com

Lake Region High School is a public high school located in Eagle Lake, Florida. It is operated by Polk County Public Schools, the countywide public school district.

Lake Region High School (LRHS) opened August 14, 1995. Current enrollment is nearly 2000, with the senior class enrollment just over 300. LRHS serves the communities of Eagle Lake, South Winter Haven, North Bartow. The school is accredited by the Southern Association of Colleges and Schools, and the State of Florida Department of Education.

LRHS shares some of its main campus layouts with George Jenkins High School in Lakeland, Florida. There are some newer facility enhancements that set the school apart. Perhaps the most noticeable is the stable for the school's equine mascot, Thunder (a white Spanish-Arabian horse). The school also has a separate freshman academy that was completed in 2010.

== Academies ==
Lake Region High School also houses several academies. These programs operate similar to a "School Within a School" with several different study tracks available. Programs that students may follow include:

- Academy of Law, Justice, & Governance
- Culinary Arts Academy
- Engineering Technology Academy
- TLC Academy (Teaching and Learning about Children)
- Thunder Threads Academy
- iMAG Technology, Marketing, and Graphic Design Academy
- Lake Region Medical Academy
- Drama Academy
- Band Academy

== Notable alumni ==
- Lamar Myles, Professional football played for the Jacksonville Jaguars NFL graduated from Louisville
- Nina Nunes, professional mixed martial artist, former UFC Strawweight
- Derek Cassidy, American football player
- Marcus Capers, Professional basketball player
- Robert Coello, Current MLB pitcher for the Los Angeles Angels of Anaheim (Formerly with the Boston Red Sox and Toronto Blue Jays)
- Deon Rexroat, Guitarist of the band Anberlin
