= Eagle Lake (Florida) =

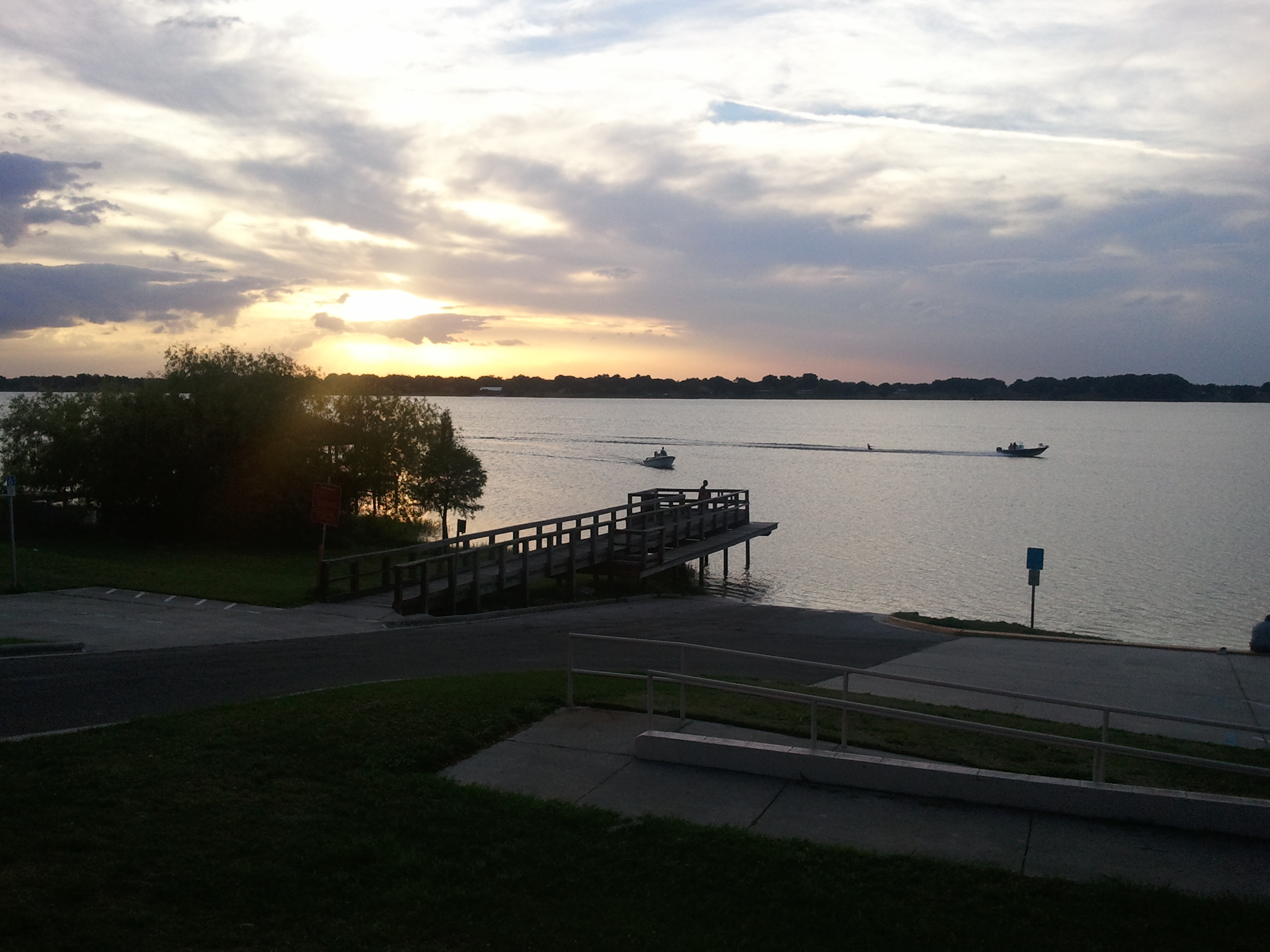
- Overlooking Eagle Lake at sunset

- Location within Florida Location within the United States
- Location: Eagle Lake, Florida
- Coordinates: 27.9875°N 81.7684°W
- Lake type: natural freshwater lake
- Basin countries: United States
- Max. length: 1.7 miles (2.7 km)
- Max. width: 1.0 mile (1.6 km)
- Surface area: 647 acres (262 ha)
- Average depth: 12.5 feet (3.8 m)
- Max. depth: 31.7 feet (9.7 m)
- Water volume: 3,673,831,467 US gallons (13.9 GL)
- Surface elevation: 131 feet (40 m)

Eagle Lake is a lake, elongated in shape, located in the northern portion of the City of Eagle Lake, Florida. This lake is a natural freshwater lake with a 647-acre (2,620,000 m^{2}) surface area. Eagle Lake is bordered by residences of Eagle Lake and Polk County.

The City of Eagle Lake maintains a boat ramp, and recreation area on the Eastern shore of Eagle Lake. Eagle Avenue leads directly into the public parking and access areas. There is a swimming area available with a white sand beach, and a pavilion is available as well. Eagle Lake contains predominantly largemouth bass, as well as bluegill and crappie.
