= 2011 Chicago Rush season =

Arena Football League team season

- Head coach: Bob McMillen
- Home stadium: Allstate Arena

Results
- Record: 13–5
- Division place: 1st NC Central
- Playoffs: Won Conference Semifinals (Dallas) 54–41; Lost Conference Championship (Arizona) 48–54
- Team DPY: Vic Hall

The 2011 Chicago Rush season was the 10th season for the franchise in the Arena Football League. The team was coached by Bob McMillen and played their home games at Allstate Arena. The Rush finished the regular season 13–5, qualifying for the playoffs for the 10th consecutive season. As the 2nd seed, they defeated the Dallas Vigilantes 54–41 in the conference semifinals before losing to the Arizona Rattlers 48–54 in the conference championship.

== Standings ==
Central Division
Team	W	L	PCT	PF	PA	DIV	CON	Home	Away
y-Chicago Rush	13	5	.722	957	833	6–2	9–3	7–2	6–3
x-Dallas Vigilantes	11	7	.611	1061	1007	6–2	7–5	6–3	5–4
Tulsa Talons	8	10	.444	894	899	3–5	4–7	4–5	4–5
Kansas City Command	6	12	.333	854	974	3–5	4–9	4–4	2–7
Iowa Barnstormers	5	13	.278	916	1116	2–6	5–7	4–5	1–8

y - Clinched division
x - Clinched playoff berth

== Schedule ==
=== Regular season ===
The Rush began the season on the road against the Milwaukee Iron on March 14. Their home opener was on March 18 as they hosted the Philadelphia Soul. In their final regular season game, they played Milwaukee at home.

Week	Day	Date	Kickoff	Opponent	Results		Location	Report
Week	Day	Date	Kickoff	Opponent	Score	Record	Location	Report
1	Monday	March 14	7:30 p.m. CDT	at Milwaukee Mustangs	W 49–41	1–0	Bradley Center	
2	Friday	March 18	7:00 p.m. CDT	Philadelphia Soul	W 62–28	2–0	Allstate Arena	
3	Friday	March 25	7:30 p.m. CDT	San Jose SaberCats	W 54–41	3–0	Allstate Arena	
4	Saturday	April 2	3:00 p.m. CDT	at Cleveland Gladiators	L 48–55	3–1	Quicken Loans Arena	
5	Bye							
6	Saturday	April 16	7:05 p.m. CDT	at Iowa Barnstormers	W 50–49	4–1	Wells Fargo Arena	
7	Friday	April 22	7:00 p.m. CDT	Kansas City Command	L 51–58	4–2	Allstate Arena	
8	Saturday	April 30	7:00 p.m. CDT	New Orleans VooDoo	W 50–28	5–2	Allstate Arena	
9	Saturday	May 7	7:00 p.m. CDT	at Tulsa Talons	L 45–64	5–3	BOK Center	
10	Saturday	May 14	7:05 p.m. CDT	at Arizona Rattlers	W 50–49	6–3	US Airways Center	
11	Sunday	May 22	3:00 p.m. CDT	Dallas Vigilantes	W 69–57	7–3	Allstate Arena	
12	Friday	May 27	7:30 p.m. CDT	Tulsa Talons	W 49–48	8–3	Allstate Arena	
13	Saturday	June 4	1:00 p.m. CDT	at Kansas City Command	W 58–30	9–3	Sprint Center	
14	Bye							
15	Saturday	June 18	9:00 p.m. CDT	at Spokane Shock	L 60–63	9–4	Spokane Veterans Memorial Arena	
16	Sunday	June 26	3:00 p.m. CDT	Iowa Barnstormers	W 58–48	10–4	Allstate Arena	
17	Friday	July 1	7:30 p.m. CDT	Utah Blaze	W 59–35	11–4	Allstate Arena	
18	Saturday	July 9	6:35 p.m. CDT	at Georgia Force	W 51–41	12–4	Arena at Gwinnett Center	
19	Saturday	July 16	7:30 p.m. CDT	at Dallas Vigilantes	W 53–44	13–4	American Airlines Center	
20	Saturday	July 23	7:00 p.m. CDT	Milwaukee Mustangs	L 41–54	13–5	Allstate Arena	

=== Playoffs ===
Round	Day	Date	Kickoff	Opponent	Results	Location	Report
NC Semifinals	Friday	July 29	7:30 p.m. CDT	Dallas Vigilantes	W 54–51	Allstate Arena	
NC Championship	Saturday	August 6	9:00 p.m. CDT	at Arizona Rattlers	L 48–54	US Airways Arena	

== Regular season ==
=== Week 1: at Milwaukee Mustangs ===
Week 1: Chicago Rush at Milwaukee Mustangs – Game summary

Quarter	1	2	3	4	Total
Rush	21	7	14	7	49
Mustangs	7	20	0	14	41

at Bradley Center, Milwaukee, Wisconsin

- Date: March 14
- Game time: 7:30 p.m. CDT
- Game attendance: 3,157
- Recap

Game information

1st quarter

- Milwaukee – (10:30) Damian Harrell 20-yard pass from Eric Ward (Garrett Lindholm kick), Milwaukee 7–0
- Chicago – (8:27) Reggie Gray 27-yard pass from Russ Michna (Chris Gould kick), Tied 7–7
- Chicago – (3:33) Charles Dillon 10-yard pass from Russ Michna (Chris Gould kick), Chicago 14–7
- Chicago – (1:32) Reggie Gray 7-yard pass from Russ Michna (Chris Gould kick), Chicago 21–7

2nd quarter

- Milwaukee – (13:45) Antoine Burns 44-yard pass from Eric Ward (Garrett Lindholm kick), Chicago 21–14
- Chicago – (9:50) Johnie Kirton 2-yard pass from Russ Michna (Chris Gould kick), Chicago 28–14
- Milwaukee – (5:31) Brent Holmes 6-yard pass from Eric Ward (Garrett Lindholm kick), Chicago 28–21
- Milwaukee – (0:36) Eric Ward 5-yard run (Garrett Lindholm kick failed), Chicago 28–27

3rd quarter

- Chicago – (13:30) Charles Dillon 13-yard pass from Russ Michna (Chris Gould kick), Chicago 35–27
- Chicago – (2:55) Reggie Gray 11-yard pass from Russ Michna (Chris Gould kick), Chicago 42–27

4th quarter

- Milwaukee – (14:53) Brent Holmes 42-yard pass from Eric Ward (Garrett Lindholm kick), Chicago 42–34
- Chicago – (9:20) Charles Dillon 23-yard pass from Russ Michna (Chris Gould kick), Chicago 49–34
- Milwaukee – (0:55) Antoine Burns 15-yard pass from Eric Ward (Garrett Lindholm kick), Chicago 49–41

Passing

- Chicago – Russ Michna: 19/26, 240 yards, 7 TD, 1 INT
- Milwaukee – Eric Ward: 25/44, 296 yards, 5 TD, 1 INT

Rushing

- Chicago – Marcus Waugh: 3 att, 16 yards
- Milwaukee – Eric Ward: 5 att, 16 yards, 1 TD

Receiving

- Chicago – Charles Dillon: 8 rec, 109 yards, 3 TD
- Milwaukee – Damian Harrell: 9 rec, 90 yards, 1 TD

=== Week 2: vs. Philadelphia Soul ===
Week 2: Philadelphia Soul at Chicago Rush – Game summary

Quarter	1	2	3	4	Total
Soul	7	7	7	7	28
Rush	21	19	8	14	62

at Allstate Arena, Rosemont, Illinois

- Date: March 18
- Game time: 7:00 p.m. CDT
- Game attendance: 10,582
- Referee: Alex Kemp
- Recap

Game information

1st quarter

- Philadelphia – (14:14) Syvelle Newton 34-yard pass from Justin Allgood (James Paul kick), Philadelphia 7–0
- Chicago – (10:23) Johnie Kirton 4-yard run (Chris Gould kick), Tied 7–7
- Chicago – (6:48) Mike Turkovich 6-yard pass from Russ Michna (Chris Gould kick), Chicago 14–7
- Chicago – (5:14) Marcus Waugh fumble return (Chris Gould kick), Chicago 21–7

2nd quarter

- Chicago – (10:08) Micah Rucker 9-yard pass from Russ Michna (Chris Gould kick), Chicago 28–7
- Chicago – (10:08) Perry Kyles 3-yard net recovery (Chris Gould kick failed), Chicago 34–7
- Chicago – (0:26) Johnie Kirton 1-yard run (Chris Gould kick blocked), Chicago 40–7
- Philadelphia – (0:00) Dominique Thompson 16-pass from Justin Allgood (James Paul kick), Chicago 40–14

3rd quarter

- Chicago – (5:27) Russ Michna 1-yard run (Vic Hall run), Chicago 48–14
- Philadelphia – (0:13) Ryan Vena 2-yard run (James Paul kick), Chicago 48–21

3rd quarter

- Chicago – (12:42) Micah Rucker 8-yard pass from Russ Michna (Chris Gould kick), Chicago 55–21
- Philadelphia – (8:27) Ryan Vena 3-yard run (James Paul kick), Chicago 55–28
- Chicago – (1:00) Reggie Gray 14-yard pass from Dominic Randolph (Chris Gould kick), Chicago 62–21

Passing

- Philadelphia – Justin Allgood: 12/22, 165 yards, 2 TD, 3 INT
- Chicago – Russ Michna: 21/29, 189 yards, 3 TD, 1 INT

Rushing

- Philadelphia – Ryan Vena: 4 att, 9 yards, 2 TD
- Chicago – Johnie Kirton: 8 att, 16 yards, 2 TD

Receiving

- Philadelphia – Donovan Morgan: 9 rec, 115 yards
- Chicago – Micah Rucker: 11 rec, 83 yards, 2 TD

=== Week 3: vs. San Jose SaberCats ===
Week 3: San Jose SaberCats at Chicago Rush – Game summary

Quarter	1	2	3	4	Total
SaberCats	8	13	7	13	41
Rush	6	14	20	14	54

at Allstate Arena, Rosemont, Illinois

- Date: March 25
- Game time: 7:30 p.m. CDT
- Game attendance: 7,466
- Referee: Tony Cannella
- Recap

Game information

1st quarter

- Chicago – (12:13) Reggie Gray 46-yard pass from Russ Michna (Vic Hall pass intercepted), Chicago 6–0
- San Jose – (12:13) Dwight Mclean PAT return, Chicago 6–2
- San Jose – (6:29) Mark Lewis 13-yard pass from Mark Grieb (Juan Gamboa kick failed), San Jose 8–6

2nd quarter

- San Jose – (9:46) Chad Cook 1-yard run (Juan Gamboa kick failed), San Jose 14–6
- Chicago – (7:16) Russ Michna 17-yard run (Chris Gould kick), San Jose 14–13
- San Jose – (3:43) Chad Cook 1-yard run (Juan Gamboa kick), San Jose 21–13
- Chicago – (2:37) Reggie Gray 39-yard pass from Russ Michna (Chris Gould kick), San Jose 21–20

3rd quarter

- Chicago – (12:03) Reggie Gray 22-yard pass from Russ Michna (Chris Gould kick failed), Chicago 26–21
- Chicago – (7:40) Russ Michna 7-yard run (Chris Gould kick), Chicago 33–21
- San Jose – (6:10) Rodney Wright 5-yard pass from Mark Grieb (Juan Gamboa kick), Chicago 33–28
- Chicago – (3:44) Charles Dillon 7-yard pass from Russ Michna (Chris Gould kick), Chicago 40–28

4th quarter

- San Jose – (13:58) Gabe Nyenhuis 7-yard interception return (Juan Gamboa kick), Chicago 40–35
- Chicago – (12:58) Micah Rucker 4-yard pass from Russ Michna (Chris Gould kick), Chicago 47–35
- San Jose – (10:47) Samora Goodson 10-yard pass from Mark Grieb (Juan Gamboa kick failed), Chicago 47–41
- Chicago – (4:41) Johnie Kirton 1-yard run (Chris Gould kick), Chicago 54–41

Passing

- San Jose – Mark Grieb: 28/46, 279 yards, 3 TD, 3 INT
- Chicago – Russ Michna: 15/21, 229 yards, 5 TD, 1 INT

Rushing

- San Jose – Chad Cook: 3 att, 6 yards, 2 TD
- Chicago – Russ Michna: 9 att, 38 yards, 2 TD

Receiving

- San Jose – Rodney Wright: 15 rec, 143 yards, 1 TD
- Chicago – Reggie Gray: 8 rec, 149 yards, 3 TD

=== Week 4: at Cleveland Gladiators ===
Week 4: Chicago Rush at Cleveland Gladiators – Game summary

Quarter	1	2	3	4	Total
Rush	7	12	14	15	48
Gladiators	7	21	14	13	55

at Quicken Loans Arena, Cleveland, Ohio

- Date: April 2
- Game time: 4:00 p.m. EDT
- Game attendance: 8,305
- Referee: Tom McCabe
- Recap

Game information

1st quarter

- Cleveland – (11:51) Troy Bergeron 23-yard pass from Kurt Rocco (Matt Denny kick), Cleveland 7–0
- Chicago – (1:48) Russ Michna 5-yard run (Chris Gould kick), Tied 7–7

2nd quarter

- Chicago – (14:53) Reggie Gray 8-yard pass from Russ Michna (Chris Gould rush failed), Chicago 13–7
- Cleveland – (10:12) Troy Bergeron 20-yard pass from Kurt Rocco (Matt Denny kick), Cleveland 14–13
- Chicago – (3:44) Micah Rucker 12-yard pass from Russ Michna (Chris Gould kick blocked), Chicago 19–14
- Cleveland – (1:35) Troy Bergeron 37-yard pass from Kurt Rocco (Matt Denny kick), Cleveland 21–19
- Cleveland – (0:16) Victor Williams 4-yard pass from Kurt Rocco (Matt Denny kick), Cleveland 28–19

3rd quarter

- Chicago – (9:26) Kelvin Morris 1-yard pass from Russ Michna (Chris Gould kick), Cleveland 28–26
- Cleveland – (5:55) Troy Bergeron 39-yard pass from Kurt Rocco (Matt Denny kick), Cleveland 35–26
- Chicago – (2:26) Johnie Kirton 4-yard run (Chris Gould kick), Cleveland 35–33
- Cleveland – (0:47) Troy Bergeron 5-yard pass from Kurt Rocco (Matt Denny kick), Cleveland 42–33

4th quarter

- Chicago – (11:38) Reggie Gray 14-yard pass from Russ Michna (Chris Gould kick failed), Cleveland 42–39
- Cleveland – (9:17) Troy Bergeron 4-yard pass from Kurt Rocco (Matt Denny kick), Cleveland 49–39
- Cleveland – (4:18) Robert Redd 21-yard pass from Kurt Rocco (Matt Denny kick blocked), Cleveland 55–39
- Chicago – (4:18) Jason Simpson PAT return, Cleveland 55–41
- Chicago – (0:58) Reggie Gray 7-yard pass from Russ Michna (Chris Gould kick), Cleveland 55–48

Passing

- Chicago – Russ Michna: 21/35, 235 yards, 5 TD, 3 INT
- Cleveland – Kurt Rocco: 21/37, 320 yards, 8 TD, 2 INT

Rushing

- Chicago – Johnie Kirton: 6 att, 31 yards, 1 TD
- Cleveland – Kurt Rocco: 1 att, 13 yards

Receiving

- Chicago – Reggie Gray: 11 rec, 144 yards, 3 TD
- Cleveland – Troy Bergeron: 10 rec, 187 yards, 6 TD

=== Week 6: at Iowa Barnstormers ===
Week 6: Chicago Rush at Iowa Barnstormers – Game summary

Quarter	1	2	3	4	Total
Rush	7	27	7	9	50
Barnstormers	21	6	15	7	49

at Wells Fargo Arena, Des Moines, Iowa

- Date: April 16
- Game time: 7:05 p.m. CDT
- Game attendance: 9,552
- Referee: Tom McCabe
- Recap

Game information

1st quarter

- Iowa – (11:01) Jesse Schmidt 32-yard pass from Brad Banks (Phil Marfuggi kick), Iowa 7–0
- Iowa – (6:45) Jesse Schmidt 9-yard pass from Brad Banks (Phil Marfuggi kick), Iowa 14–0
- Chicago – (5:16) Charles Dillon 43-yard pass from Russ Michna (Chris Gould kick), Iowa 14–7
- Iowa – (1:32) Jesse Schmidt 4-yard pass from Brad Banks (Phil Marfuggi kick), Iowa 21–7

2nd quarter

- Chicago – (9:32) Reggie Gray 24-yard pass from Russ Michna (Chris Gould kick), Iowa 21–14
- Chicago – (3:53) Marcus Waugh 1-yard run (Chris Gould kick failed), Iowa 21–20
- Chicago – (2:44) Reggie Gray 4-yard pass from Russ Michna (Chris Gould kick), Chicago 27–21
- Iowa – (0:52) Jesse Schmidt 16-yard pass from Brad Banks (Phil Marfuggi kick failed), Tied 27–27
- Chicago – (0:15) Reggie Gray 27-yard pass from Russ Michna (Chris Gould kick), Chicago 34–27

3rd quarter

- Iowa – (11:07) Jesse Schmidt 15-yard pass from Brad Banks (Phil Marfuggi kick failed), Chicago 34–33
- Chicago – (8:10) Charles Dillon 26-yard pass from Russ Michna (Chris Gould kick), Chicago 41–33
- Iowa – (4:32) Jesse Schmidt 4-yard pass from Brad Banks (Phil Marfuggi kick), Chicago 41–40
- Iowa – (2:32) Team safety, Iowa 42–41

4th quarter

- Iowa – (8:11) Jesse Schmidt 12-yard pass from Brad Banks (Phil Marfuggi kick), Iowa 49–41
- Chicago – (5:48) Reggie Gray 12-yard pass from Russ Michna (Russ Michna pass failed), Iowa 49–47
- Chicago – (0:01) Chris Gould 18-yard field goal, Chicago 50–47

Passing

- Chicago – Russ Michna: 16/27, 243 yards, 6 TD, 2 INT
- Iowa – Brad Banks: 26/41, 271 yards, 7 TD, 1 INT

Rushing

- Chicago – Russ Michna: 3 att, 9 yards
- Iowa – Rodney Filer: 3 att, 21 yards

Receiving

- Chicago – Reggie Gray: 8 rec, 121 yards, 4 TD
- Iowa – Jesse Schmidt: 10 rec, 113 yards, 7 TD

=== Week 7: vs. Kansas City Command ===
Week 7: Kansas City Command at Chicago Rush – Game summary

Quarter	1	2	3	4	Total
Command	7	31	6	14	58
Rush	13	17	7	14	51

at Allstate Arena, Rosemont, Illinois

- Date: April 22
- Game time: 7:00 p.m. CDT
- Game attendance: 7,310
- Referee: Alex Kemp
- Recap

Game information

1st quarter

- Chicago – (13:10) Reggie Gray 10-yard pass from Russ Michna (Chris Gould kick), Chicago 7–0
- Kansas City – (8:09) Steven Savoy 3-yard pass from J.J. Raterink (Brian Umstead kick), Tied 7–7
- Chicago – (3:47) Johnie Kirton 5-yard run (Chris Gould kick blocked), Chicago 13–7

2nd quarter

- Kansas City – (14:58) J.J. Raterink 1-yard run (Brian Umstead kick), Kansas City 14–13
- Chicago – (12:51) Charles Dillon 25-yard pass from Russ Michna (Chris Gould kick), Chicago 20–14
- Chicago – (6:01) Chris Gould 23-yard field goal, Chicago 23–14
- Kansas City – (4:11) Bret Smith 34-yard pass from J.J. Raterink (Brian Umstead kick), Chicago 23–21
- Chicago – (2:30) Joe Clermond 43-yard fumble recovery (Chris Gould kick), Chicago 30–21
- Kansas City – (0:45) J.J. Raterink 25-yard run (Brian Umstead kick), Chicago 30–28
- Kansas City – (0:36) Steven Savoy 1-yard run (Brian Umstead kick), Kansas City 35–30
- Kansas City – (0:00) Brian Umstead 37-yard field goal, Kansas City 38–30

3rd quarter

- Kansas City – (12:45) Steven Savoy 20-yard pass from J.J. Raterink (Brian Umstead kick failed), Kansas City 44–30
- Chicago – (12:45) Reggie Gray 55-yard kickoff return (Chris Gould kick), Kansas City 44–37

4th quarter

- Chicago – (13:14) Johnie Kirton 20-yard pass from Russ Michna (Chris Gould kick), Tied 44–44
- Kansas City – (10:07) Aaron Hosack 3-yard pass from J.J. Raterink (Brian Umstead kick), Kansas City 51–44
- Chicago – (4:23) Johnie Kirton 5-yard pass from Russ Michna (Chris Gould kick), Tied 51–51
- Kansas City – (2:08) Steven Savoy 32-yard pass from J.J. Raterink (Brian Umstead kick), Kansas City 58–51

Passing

- Kansas City – J.J. Raterink: 27/36, 286 yards, 5 TD, 2 INT
- Chicago – Russ Michna: 15/26, 163 yards, 4 TD

Rushing

- Kansas City – J.J. Raterink: 6 att, 47 yards, 2 TD
- Chicago – Johnie Kirton: 7 att, 34 yards, 1 TD

Receiving

- Kansas City – Steven Savoy: 14 rec, 136 yards, 3 TD
- Chicago – Reggie Gray: 4 rec, 52 yards, 1 TD

=== Week 8: vs. New Orleans VooDoo ===
Week 8: New Orleans VooDoo at Chicago Rush – Game summary

Quarter	1	2	3	4	Total
VooDoo	7	7	0	14	28
Rush	23	13	14	0	50

at Allstate Arena, Rosemont, Illinois

- Date: April 30
- Game time: 7:00 p.m. CDT
- Game attendance: 9,018
- Referee: Tom McCabe
- Recap

Game information

1st quarter

- Chicago – (12:07) Brett McDermott 9-yard pass from Russ Michna (Chris Gould kick), Chicago 7–0
- New Orleans – (9:30) Lucas Taylor 32-yard pass from Chris Wallace (Jonathan Ruffin kick), Tied 7–7
- Chicago – (5:46) Quartez Vickerson safety, Chicago 9–7
- Chicago – (3:59) Todd Devoe 5-yard pass from Russ Michna (Chris Gould kick), Chicago 16–7
- Chicago – (1:07) Charles Dillon 10-yard pass from Russ Michna (Chris Gould kick), Chicago 23–7

2nd quarter

- New Orleans – (3:38) P.J. Berry 4-yard run (Jonathan Ruffin kick), Chicago 23–14
- Chicago – (2:41) Reggie Gray 36-yard pass from Russ Michna (Chris Gould kick failed), Chicago 29–14
- Chicago – (0:16) Reggie Gray 45-yard pass from Russ Michna (Chris Gould kick), Chicago 36–14

3rd quarter

- Chicago – (6:28) Reggie Gray 14-yard pass from Russ Michna (Chris Gould kick), Chicago 43–14
- Chicago – (4:28) Vic Hall 18-yard interception return (Chris Gould kick), Chicago 50–14

4th quarter

- New Orleans – (13:22) P.J. Berry 1-yard run (Jonathan Ruffin kick), Chicago 50–21
- New Orleans – (7:19) P.J. Berry 4-yard pass from Danny Wimprine (Jonathan Ruffin kick), Chicago 50–28

Passing

- New Orleans – Chris Wallace: 18/33, 168 yards, 1 TD, 3 INT
- Chicago – Russ Michna: 17/22, 213 yards, 6 TD

Rushing

- New Orleans – P.J. Berry: 2 att, 5 yards, 2 TD
- Chicago – Johnie Kirton: 6 att, 33 yards

Receiving

- New Orleans – P.J. Berry: 12 rec, 132 yards, 1 TD
- Chicago – Reggie Gray: 4 rec, 52 yards, 1 TD

=== Week 9: at Tulsa Talons ===
Week 9: Chicago Rush at Tulsa Talons – Game summary

Quarter	1	2	3	4	Total
Rush	14	14	7	10	45
Talons	10	24	20	10	64

at BOK Center, Tulsa, Oklahoma

- Date: May 7
- Game time: 7:00 p.m. CDT
- Referee: Shawn Hochuli
- Recap

Game information

1st quarter

- Chicago – (12:44) Marcus Waugh 2-yard run (Chris Gould kick), Chicago 7–0
- Chicago – (11:27) Jason Simpson 9-yard interception return (Chris Gould kick), Chicago 14–0
- Tulsa – (6:25) Matt Bassuener 1-yard run (Juan Bongarra kick), Chicago 14–7
- Tulsa – (0:59) Juan Bongarra 27-yard field goal, Chicago 14–10

2nd quarter

- Tulsa – (12:10) Troy McBroom 34-yard pass from Matt Bassuener (Juan Bongarra kick), Tulsa 17–14
- Tulsa – (8:02) Juan Bongarra 33-yard field goal, Tulsa 20–14
- Tulsa – (6:50) Matt Bassuener 12-yard run (Juan Bongarra kick), Tulsa 27–14
- Chicago – (5:11) Reggie Gray 43-yard pass from Russ Michna (Chris Gould kick), Tulsa 27–21
- Chicago – (0:15) Charles Dillon 24-yard pass from Russ Michna (Chris Gould kick), Chicago 28–27
- Tulsa – (0:06) Troy McBroom 18-yard pass from Matt Bassuener (Juan Bongarra kick), Tulsa 34–28

3rd quarter

- Tulsa – (11:50) Matt Bassuener 8-yard run (Juan Bongarra kick failed), Tulsa 40–28
- Tulsa – (7:47) Jamar Ransom 2-yard run (Juan Bongarra kick), Tulsa 47–28
- Chicago – (6:45) Reggie Gray 34-yard pass from Russ Michna (Chris Gould kick), Tulsa 47–35
- Tulsa – (3:47) Matt Bassuener 7-yard run (Juan Bongarra kick), Tulsa 54–35

4th quarter

- Tulsa – (14:50) Trent Shelton 30-yard pass from Matt Bassuener (Juan Bongarra kick), Tulsa 61–35
- Tulsa – (6:34) Juan Bongarra 31-yard field goal, Tulsa 64–35
- Chicago – (3:42) Reggie Gray 7-yard pass from Dominick Randolph (Dominick Randolph pass), Tulsa 64–43
- Chicago – (2:14) Team safety, Tulsa 64–45

Passing

- Chicago – Russ Michna: 17/26, 248 yards, 3 TD, 1 INT
- Tulsa – Matt Bassuener: 17/31, 234 yards, 3 TD, 3 INT

Rushing

- Chicago – Johnie Kirton: 3 att, 10 yards
- Tulsa – Matt Bassuener: 7 att, 33 yards, 4 TD

Receiving

- Chicago – Reggie Gray: 7 rec, 142 yards, 3 TD
- Tulsa – Troy McBroom: 13 rec, 144 yards, 3 TD

=== Week 10: at Arizona Rattlers ===
Week 10: Chicago Rush at Arizona Rattlers – Game summary

Quarter	1	2	3	4	Total
Rush	13	7	13	17	50
Rattlers	14	7	21	7	49

at US Airways Center, Phoenix, Arizona

- Date: May 14
- Game time: 7:05 p.m. CDT
- Game attendance: 9,000
- Referee: Shawn Hochuli
- Recap

Game information

1st quarter

- Chicago – (9:29) Reggie Gray 22-yard pass from Russ Michna (Chris Gould kick), Chicago 7–0
- Arizona – (7:37) Odie Armstrong 1-yard run (Fabrizio Scaccia kick), Tied 7–7
- Chicago – (4:17) Reggie Gray 6-yard pass from Russ Michna (Chris Gould kick failed), Chicago 13–7
- Arizona – (2:34) Rod Windsor 36-yard pass from Nick Davila (Fabrizio Scaccia kick), Arizona 14–13

2nd quarter

- Chicago – (9:21) Reggie Gray 11-yard pass from Russ Michna (Chris Gould kick), Chicago 20–14
- Arizona – (0:02) Trandon Harvey 3-yard pass from Nick Davila (Fabrizio Scaccia kick), Arizona 21–20

3rd quarter

- Arizona – (10:22) Odie Armstrong 5-yard run (Fabrizio Scaccia kick), Arizona 28–20
- Chicago – (7:44) J.J. McKelvey 7-yard pass from Russ Michna (Chris Gould kick failed), Arizona 28–26
- Arizona – (4:45) Rod Windsor 9-yard pass from Nick Davila (Fabrizio Scaccia kick), Arizona 35–26
- Chicago – (3:46) Jason Simpson −4-yard kickoff return (Chris Gould kick), Arizona 35–33
- Arizona – (1:16) Rod Windsor 8-yard pass from Nick Davila (Fabrizio Scaccia kick), Arizona 42–33

4th quarter

- Chicago – (4:37) Charles Dillon 9-yard pass from Russ Michna (Chris Gould kick), Arizona 42–40
- Arizona – (0:51) Jason Geathers 7-yard pass from Nick Davila (Fabrizio Scaccia kick), Arizona 49–40
- Chicago – (0:22) Johnie Kirton 1-yard run (Chris Gould kick), Arizona 49–47
- Chicago – (0:01) Chris Gould 33-yard field goal, Chicago 50–49

Passing

- Chicago – Russ Michna: 23/40, 267 yards, 5 TD, 2 INT
- Arizona – Nick Davila: 23/31, 297 yards, 5 TD

Rushing

- Chicago – Johnie Kirton: 6 att, 18 yards, 1 TD
- Arizona – Odie Armstrong: 6 att, 24 yards, 2 TD

Receiving

- Chicago – Reggie Gray: 9 rec, 141 yards, 3 TD
- Arizona – Rod Windsor: 9 rec, 119 yards, 3 TD

=== Week 11: vs. Dallas Vigilantes ===
Week 11: Dallas Vigilantes at Chicago Rush – Game summary

Quarter	1	2	3	4	Total
Vigilantes	14	10	13	20	57
Rush	14	14	20	21	69

at Allstate Arena, Rosemont, Illinois

- Date: May 22
- Game time: 3:00 p.m. CDT
- Game attendance: 9,535
- Referee: Alex Kemp
- Recap

Game information

1st quarter

- Dallas – (11:37) Derrick Ross 1-yard run (Remy Hamilton kick), Dallas 7–0
- Chicago – (8:09) Reggie Gray 4-yard pass from Russ Michna (Chris Gould kick), Tied 7–7
- Chicago – (2:41) Reggie Gray 12-yard pass from Russ Michna (Chris Gould kick), Chicago 14–7
- Dallas – (0:00) Matt Fields 18-yard pass from Dan Raudabaugh (Remy Hamilton kick), Tied 14–14

2nd quarter

- Dallas – (9:27) Remy Hamilton 33-yard field goal, Dallas 17–14
- Chicago – (5:48) Charles Dillon 23-yard pass from Russ Michna (Chris Gould kick), Chicago 21–17
- Dallas – (3:57) Anthony Jones 21-yard pass from Dan Raudabaugh (Remy Hamilton kick), Dallas 24–21
- Chicago – (0:07) Marcus Waugh 1-yard run (Chris Gould kick), Chicago 28–24

3rd quarter

- Chicago – (14:27) Reggie Gray 40-yard pass from Russ Michna (Chris Gould kick), Chicago 35–24
- Dallas – (12:25) Derrick Ross 1-yard run (Remy Hamilton kick blocked), Chicago 35–30
- Chicago – (8:10) T.J. Watkins 11-yard pass from Russ Michna (Chris Gould kick failed), Chicago 41–30
- Dallas – (4:51) Derrick Ross 1-yard run (Remy Hamilton kick), Chicago 41–37
- Chicago – (2:05) Marco Thomas 8-yard pass from Russ Michna (Chris Gould kick), Chicago 48–37

4th quarter

- Dallas – (13:02) Anthony Jones 6-yard pass from Dan Raudabaugh (Remy Hamilton kick), Chicago 48–44
- Chicago – (11:48) Charles Dillon 48-yard pass from Russ Michna (Chris Gould kick), Chicago 55–44
- Chicago – (8:03) Kelvin Morris 55-yard interception return (Chris Gould kick), Chicago 62–44
- Dallas – (6:02) Matt Fields 10-yard pass from Dan Raudabaugh (Remy Hamilton kick blocked), Chicago 62–50
- Chicago – (2:59) Johnie Kirton 3-yard run (Chris Gould kick), Chicago 69–50
- Dallas – (0:37) DeAndrew Rubin 12-yard pass from Dan Raudabaugh (Remy Hamilton kick), Chicago 69–57

Passing

- Dallas – Dan Raudabaugh: 29/39, 322 yards, 5 TD, 2 INT
- Chicago – Russ Michna: 20/24, 264 yards, 7 TD

Rushing

- Dallas – Derrick Ross: 7 att, 22 yards, 3 TD
- Chicago – Johnie Kirton: 13 att, 28 yards, 1 TD

Receiving

- Dallas – Anthony Jones: 16 rec, 179 yards, 2 TD
- Chicago – Charles Dillon: 6 rec, 113 yards, 2 TD

=== Week 12: vs. Tulsa Talons ===
Week 12: Tulsa Talons at Chicago Rush – Game summary

Quarter	1	2	3	4	Total
Talons	6	20	7	15	48
Rush	21	7	14	7	49

at Allstate Arena, Rosemont, Illinois

- Date: May 27
- Game time: 7:30 p.m. CDT
- Game attendance: 7,350
- Referee: Tony Cannella
- Recap

Game information

1st quarter

- Chicago – (9:26) Reggie Gray 4-yard pass from Russ Michna (Chris Gould kick), Chicago 7–0
- Tulsa – (6:38) Matt Bassuener 1-yard run (Juan Bongarra kick failed), Chicago 7–6
- Chicago – (5:38) Reggie Gray 58-yard kickoff return (Chris Gould kick), Chicago 14–6
- Chicago – (1:35) J.J. McKelvey 8-yard pass from Russ Michna (Chris Gould kick), Chicago 21–6

2nd quarter

- Tulsa – (10:41) Troy McBroom 15-yard pass from Justin Allgood (Juan Bongarra kick), Chicago 21–13
- Chicago – (8:03) J.J. McKelvey 24-yard pass from Russ Michna (Chris Gould kick), Chicago 28–13
- Tulsa – (1:00) J.J. Payne 1-yard run (Matt Bassuener pass failed), Chicago 28–19
- Tulsa – (0:13) Brandon Copeland 17-yard pass from Justin Allgood (Juan Bongarra kick), Chicago 28–26

3rd quarter

- Tulsa – (13:26) Trent Shelton 20-yard pass from Justin Allgood (Juan Bongarra kick), Tulsa 33–28
- Chicago – (8:11) Charles Dillon 14-yard pass from Russ Michna (Chris Gould kick), Chicago 35–33
- Chicago – (1:27) J.J. McKelvey 13-yard pass from Russ Michna (Chris Gould kick), Chicago 42–33

4th quarter

- Tulsa – (13:20) Troy McBroom 7-yard pass from Justin Allgood (Juan Bongarra kick), Chicago 42–40
- Tulsa – (3:59) Trent Shelton 14-yard pass from Justin Allgood (Justin Allgood pass), Tulsa 48–42
- Chicago – (0:00) Russ Michna 1-yard run (Chris Gould kick), Chicago 49–48

Passing

- Tulsa – Justin Allgood: 21/40, 233 yards, 5 TD, 3 INT
- Chicago – Russ Michna: 19/32, 201 yards, 5 TD, 1 INT

Rushing

- Tulsa – J.J. Payne: 5 att, 11 yards, 1 TD
- Chicago – Russ Michna: 4 att, 4 yards, 1 TD

Receiving

- Tulsa – Troy McBroom: 10 rec, 126 yards, 2 TD
- Chicago – J.J. McKelvey: 9 rec, 88 yards, 3 TD

=== Week 13: at Kansas City Command ===
Week 13: Chicago Rush at Kansas City Command – Game summary

Quarter	1	2	3	4	Total
Rush	7	16	7	28	58
Command	0	9	14	7	30

at Sprint Center, Kansas City, Missouri

- Date: June 4
- Game time: 1:00 p.m. CDT
- Game attendance: 3,635
- Referee: Tom McCabe
- Recap

Game information

1st quarter

- Chicago – (10:26) Reggie Gray 4-yard pass from Russ Michna (Chris Gould kick), Chicago 7–0

2nd quarter

- Chicago – (13:37) Chris Gould 21-yard field goal, Chicago 10–0
- Chicago – (5:34) Derek Lee 17-yard pass from Russ Michna (Chris Gould kick), Chicago 17–0
- Kansas City – (0:15) Todd Devoe 45-yard pass from J.J. Raterink (Brian Umstead kick), Chicago 17–7
- Kansas City – (0:08) Bobby Payne safety, Chicago 17–9
- Chicago – (0:08) Jason Simpson 0-yard net recovery (Chris Gould kick failed), Chicago 23–9

3rd quarter

- Kansas City – (9:05) Robert Gill 9-yard pass from J.J. Raterink (Brian Umstead kick), Chicago 23–16
- Chicago – (6:37) Charles Dillon 34-yard pass from Russ Michna (Chris Gould kick), Chicago 30–16
- Kansas City – (1:19) Bret Smith 11-yard pass from J.J. Raterink (Brian Umstead kick), Chicago 30–23

4th quarter

- Chicago – (14:10) Derek Lee 27-yard pass from Russ Michna (Chris Gould kick), Chicago 37–23
- Chicago – (10:41) Charles Dillon 12-yard pass from Russ Michna (Chris Gould kick failed), Chicago 43–23
- Kansas City – (9:11) Bret Smith 15-yard pass from J.J. Raterink (Brian Umstead kick), Chicago 43–30
- Chicago – (5:35) Vic Hall 40-yard interception return (Chris Gould kick failed), Chicago 49–30
- Chicago – (4:08) Martin Parker safety, Chicago 51–30
- Chicago – (3:34) Reggie Gray 9-yard pass from Russ Michna (Chris Gould kick), Chicago 58–30

Passing

- Chicago – Russ Michna: 20/28, 243 yards, 6 TD
- Kansas City – J.J. Raterink: 20/39, 244 yards, 4 TD, 2 INT

Rushing

- Chicago – Russ Michna: 1 att, 11 yards
- Kansas City – J.J. Raterink: 7 att, 23 yards

Receiving

- Chicago – Charles Dillon: 6 rec, 96 yards, 2 TD
- Kansas City – Todd Devoe: 8 rec, 103 yards, 2 TD

=== Week 15: at Spokane Shock ===
Week 15: Chicago Rush at Spokane Shock – Game summary

Quarter	1	2	3	4	Total
Rush	14	13	12	21	60
Shock	14	28	14	7	63

at Spokane Veterans Memorial Arena, Spokane, Washington

- Date: June 18
- Game time: 9:00 p.m. CDT
- Game attendance: 9,499
- Referee: Dave Cutaia
- Recap

Game information

1st quarter

- Chicago – (12:24) Reggie Gray 17-yard pass from Russ Michna (Rob Forstrom kick), Chicago 7–0
- Spokane – (9:28) Emery Sammons 6-yard pass from Erik Meyer (Taylor Rowan kick), Tied 7–7
- Chicago – (6:39) Reggie Gray 6-yard pass from Russ Michna (Rob Forstrom kick), Chicago 14–7
- Spokane – (3:05) Greg Orton 5-yard pass from Erik Meyer (Taylor Rowan kick), Tied 14–14

2nd quarter

- Chicago – (13:30) Reggie Gray 29-yard pass from Russ Michna (Rob Forstrom kick failed), Chicago 20–14
- Spokane – (9:06) Markee White 15-yard pass from Erik Meyer (Taylor Rowan kick), Spokane 21–20
- Chicago – (6:49) Reggie Gray 8-yard pass from Russ Michna (Rob Forstrom kick), Chicago 27–21
- Spokane – (4:45) Shaun Kauleinamoku 29-yard pass from Erik Meyer (Taylor Rowan kick), Spokane 28–27
- Spokane – (0:26) Antwan Marsh 1-yard run (Taylor Rowan kick), Spokane 35–27
- Spokane – (0:20) Jonathan Williams 0-yard fumble recovery (Taylor Rowan kick), Spokane 42–27

3rd quarter

- Spokane – (13:41) Greg Orton 37-yard pass from Erik Meyer (Taylor Rowan kick), Spokane 49–27
- Chicago – (8:40) Charles Dillon 11-yard pass from Dominic Randolph (Rob Forstrom kick failed), Spokane 49–33
- Chicago – (2:35) Charles Dillon 4-yard pass from Dominic Randolph (Dominic Randolph pass failed), Spokane 49–39
- Spokane – (0:50) Greg Orton 43-yard pass from Steven Sheffield (Taylor Rowan kick), Spokane 56–39

4th quarter

- Chicago – (14:08) Charles Dillon 31-yard pass from Dominic Randolph (Rob Forstrom kick failed), Spokane 56–45
- Spokane – (11:10) Shaun Kauleinamoku 32-yard pass from Steven Sheffield (Taylor Rowan kick), Spokane 63–45
- Chicago – (5:22) Reggie Gray 7-yard pass from Dominic Randolph (Rob Forstrom kick), Spokane 63–52
- Chicago – (0:52) Dominic Randolph 7-yard run (Dominic Randolph pass), Spokane 63–60

Passing

- Chicago – Russ Michna: 13/18, 161 yards, 4 TD, 1 INT
- Spokane – Erik Meyer: 15/19, 202 yards, 5 TD, 1 INT

Rushing

- Chicago – Johnie Kirton: 5 att, 27 yards
- Spokane – Clay Harrell: 4 att, 16 yards

Receiving

- Chicago – Reggie Gray: 9 rec, 125 yards, 4 TD
- Spokane – Greg Orton: 10 rec, 169 yards, 3 TD

=== Week 16: vs. Iowa Barnstormers ===
Week 16: Iowa Barnstormers at Chicago Rush – Game summary

Quarter	1	2	3	4	Total
Barnstormers	27	0	0	21	48
Rush	7	20	13	18	58

at Allstate Arena, Rosemont, Illinois

- Date: June 26
- Game time: 3:00 p.m. CDT
- Game attendance: 9,063
- Referee: Alex Kemp
- Recap

Game information

1st quarter

- Iowa – (13:58) Jesse Schmidt 5-yard pass from Brian Lee-Lauduski (Nick Pertuit kick), Iowa 7–0
- Chicago – (11:57) Charles Dillon 23-yard pass from Dominic Randolph (Rob Forstrom kick), Tied 7–7
- Iowa – (10:09) Jesse Schmidt 18-yard pass from Brian Lee-Lauduski (Nick Pertuit kick failed), Iowa 13–7
- Iowa – (4:31) Rodney Filer 5-yard run (Nick Pertuit kick), Iowa 20–7
- Iowa – (1:48) Jesse Schmidt 3-yard pass from Brian Lee-Lauduski (Nick Pertuit kick), Iowa 27–7

2nd quarter

- Chicago – (14:15) Reggie Gray 25-yard pass from Dominic Randolph (Rob Forstrom kick), Iowa 27–14
- Chicago – (6:23) Johnie Kirton 2-yard run (Rob Forstrom kick), Iowa 27–21
- Chicago – (0:46) Charles Dillon 9-yard pass from Dominic Randolph (Rob Forstrom kick failed), Tied 27–27

3rd quarter

- Chicago – (8:19) Johnie Kirton 3-yard run (Rob Forstrom kick), Chicago 34–27
- Chicago – (1:24) Reggie Gray 13-yard pass from Dominic Randolph (J.J. Raterink pass failed), Chicago 40–27

4th quarter

- Iowa – (14:52) Errick McCown 29-yard pass from Brian Lee-Lauduski (Nick Pertuit kick), Chicago 40–34
- Iowa – (11:48) Errick McCown 12-yard pass from Brian Lee-Lauduski (Nick Pertuit kick), Iowa 41–40
- Chicago – (11:03) Reggie Gray 57-yard kickoff return (Dominic Randolph pass), Chicago 48–41
- Iowa – (7:09) Marquis Hamilton 18-yard pass from Brian Lee-Lauduski (Nick Pertuit kick), Tied 48–48
- Chicago – (6:17) Reggie Gray 55-yard kickoff return (Rob Forstrom kick), Chicago 55–48
- Chicago – (2:05) Rob Forstrom 29-yard field goal, Chicago 58–48

Passing

- Iowa – Brian Lee-Lauduski: 33/48, 355 yards, 6 TD, 3 INT
- Chicago – Dominic Randolph: 17/27, 189 yards, 4 TD, 1 INT

Rushing

- Iowa – Rodney Filer: 3 att, 8 yards, 1 TD
- Chicago – Johnie Kirton: 8 att, 28 yards, 2 TD

Receiving

- Iowa – Marquis Hamilton: 11 rec, 122 yards, 1 TD
- Chicago – Charles Dillon: 10 rec, 104 yards, 2 TD

=== Week 17: vs. Utah Blaze ===
Week 17: Utah Blaze at Chicago Rush – Game summary

Quarter	1	2	3	4	Total
Blaze	14	14	7	0	35
Rush	14	14	10	21	59

at Allstate Arena, Rosemont, Illinois

- Date: July 1
- Game time: 7:30 p.m. CDT
- Game attendance: 7,342
- Referee: Tom McCabe
- Recap

Game information

1st quarter

- Chicago – (12:34) Johnie Kirton 10-yard run (Rob Forstrom kick), Chicago 7–0
- Utah – (10:04) Aaron Lesue 9-yard pass from Tommy Grady (Kyle Brotzman kick), Tied 7–7
- Chicago – (7:59) Derek Lee 17-yard pass from J.J. Raterink (Rob Forstrom kick), Chicago 14–7
- Utah – (1:07) Ernest Pierce 19-yard pass from Tommy Grady (Kyle Brotzman kick), Tied 14–14

2nd quarter

- Chicago – (12:43) Charles Dillon 15-yard pass from J.J. Raterink (Rob Forstrom kick), Chicago 21–14
- Utah – (11:55) Aaron Lesue 19-yard pass from Tommy Grady (Kyle Brotzman kick), Tied 21–21
- Chicago – (10:45) Reggie Gray 45-yard pass from J.J. Raterink (Rob Forstrom kick), Chicago 28–21
- Utah – (6:12) Aaron Lesue 8-yard pass from Tommy Grady (Kyle Brotzman kick), Tied 28–28

3rd quarter

- Chicago – (10:24) Rob Forstrom 30-yard field goal, Chicago 31–28
- Utah – (8:14) Alvance Robinson 23-yard pass from Jordan Rasmussen (Kyle Brotzman kick), Utah 35–31
- Chicago – (4:27) Johnie Kirton 3-yard run (Rob Forstrom kick), Chicago 38–35

4th quarter

- Chicago – (13:02) J.J. Raterink 1-yard run (Rob Forstrom kick), Chicago 45–35
- Chicago – (4:28) Reggie Gray 37-yard pass from J.J. Raterink (Rob Forstrom kick), Chicago 52–35
- Chicago – (1:19) Johnie Kirton 4-yard run (Rob Forstrom kick), Chicago 59–35

Passing

- Utah – Tommy Grady: 10/16, 162 yards, 4 TD, 1 INT
- Chicago – Dominic Randolph: 19/33, 281 yards, 4 TD

Rushing

- Utah – Jordan Rasmussen: 2 att, 4 yards
- Chicago – Johnie Kirton: 9 att, 46 yards, 3 TD

Receiving

- Utah – Aaron Lesue: 10 rec, 126 yards, 3 TD
- Chicago – Reggie Gray: 5 rec, 142 yards, 2 TD

=== Week 18: at Georgia Force ===
Week 18: Chicago Rush at Georgia Force – Game summary

Quarter	1	2	3	4	Total
Rush	28	10	6	7	51
Force	14	0	7	20	41

at Arena at Gwinnett Center, Duluth, Georgia

- Date: July 9
- Game time: 6:35 p.m. CDT
- Game attendance: 9,723
- Referee: Chris Snead
- Recap

Game information

1st quarter

- Chicago – (13:05) Charles Dillon 13-yard pass from J.J. Raterink (Rob Forstrom kick), Chicago 7–0
- Chicago – (11:40) Kelvin Morris 12-yard fumble recovery (Rob Forstrom kick), Chicago 14–0
- Georgia – (10:17) Alonzo Nix 30-yard pass from Brett Elliott (Carlos Martinez kick), Chicago 14–7
- Chicago – (4:09) J.J. Raterink 1-yard run (Rob Forstrom kick), Chicago 21–7
- Georgia – (2:25) Larry Shipp 22-yard pass from Brett Elliott (Carlos Martinez kick), Chicago 21–14
- Chicago – (0:27) Derek Lee 21-yard pass from J.J. Raterink (Rob Forstrom kick), Chicago 28–14

2nd quarter

- Chicago – (12:12) Rob Forstrom 20-yard field goal, Chicago 31–14
- Chicago – (8:45) Kelvin Morris 37-yard interception return (Rob Forstrom kick), Chicago 38–14

3rd quarter

- Georgia – (13:05) Eric Crosby 12-yard interception return (Carlos Martinez kick), Chicago 38–21
- Chicago – (7:10) Reggie Gray 7-yard pass from J.J. Raterink (Rob Forstrom kick failed), Chicago 44–21

4th quarter

- Chicago – (14:25) Reggie Gray 24-yard pass from J.J. Raterink (Rob Forstrom kick), Chicago 51–21
- Georgia – (8:49) C.J. Johnson 5-yard pass from Darnell Kennedy (Carlos Martinez kick), Chicago 51–28
- Georgia – (4:50) Mike Johnson 3-yard pass from Darnell Kennedy (Carlos Martinez kick), Chicago 51–35
- Georgia – (0:20) Alonzo Nix 3-yard pass from Darnell Kennedy, Chicago 51–41

Passing

- Chicago – J.J. Raterink: 20/30, 223 yards, 4 TD, 1 INT
- Georgia – Darnell Kennedy: 15/25, 161 yards, 3 TD, 1 INT

Rushing

- Chicago – Marcus Waugh: 3 att, 14 yards
- Georgia – Larry Shipp: 1 att, 5 yards

Receiving

- Chicago – Reggie Gray: 11 rec, 113 yards, 2 TD
- Georgia – C.J. Johnson: 10 rec, 111 yards, 1 TD

=== Week 19: at Dallas Vigilantes ===
Week 19: Chicago Rush at Dallas Vigilantes – Game summary

Quarter	1	2	3	4	Total
Rush	14	7	14	18	53
Vigilantes	23	14	0	7	44

at American Airlines Center, Dallas, Texas

- Date: July 16
- Game time: 7:30 p.m. CDT
- Game attendance: 11,553
- Referee: Scott Vaughn
- Recap

Game information

1st quarter

- Dallas – (11:27) Anthony Jones 33-yard pass from Dan Raudabaugh (Remy Hamilton kick), Dallas 7–0
- Chicago – (10:11) Charles Dillon 41-yard pass from J.J. Raterink (Chris Gould kick), Tied 7–7
- Dallas – (8:27) DeAndrew Rubin 37-yard pass from Dan Raudabaugh (Remy Hamilton kick), Dallas 14–7
- Dallas – (5:22) Larry Dibbles safety, Dallas 16–7
- Dallas – (4:12) John Ferguson 15-yard pass from Dan Raudabaugh (Remy Hamilton kick), Dallas 23–7
- Chicago – (1:38) Charles Dillon 5-yard pass from J.J. Raterink (Chris Gould kick), Dallas 23–14

2nd quarter

- Dallas – (12:55) Derrick Ross 4-yard run (Remy Hamilton kick), Dallas 30–14
- Chicago – (9:15) Reggie Gray 17-yard pass from J.J. Raterink (Chris Gould kick), Dallas 30–21
- Dallas – (3:13) Derrick Ross 1-yard run (Remy Hamilton kick), Dallas 37–21

3rd quarter

- Chicago – (12:21) Derek Lee 18-yard pass from J.J. Raterink (Chris Gould kick), Dallas 37–28
- Chicago – (3;36) Johnie Kirton 3-yard run (Chris Gould kick), Dallas 37–35

4th quarter

- Dallas – (14:26) John Ferguson 6-yard pass from Dan Raudabaugh (Remy Hamilton kick), Dallas 44–35
- Chicago – (12:01) Reggie Gray 24-yard pass from J.J. Raterink (Charles Dillon rush), Dallas 44–43
- Chicago – (2:28) Reggie Gray 47-yard pass from J.J. Raterink (J.J. Raterink pass), Chicago 51–44
- Chicago – (1:28) Team safety, Chicago 53–44

Passing

- Chicago – J.J. Raterink: 19/29, 294 yards, 6 TD
- Dallas – Darnell Kennedy: 25/45, 337 yards, 4 TD

Rushing

- Chicago – Johnie Kirton: 8 att, 18 yards, 1 TD
- Dallas – Derrick Ross: 9 att, 30 yards, 2 TD

Receiving

- Chicago – Reggie Gray: 6 rec, 126 yards, 3 TD
- Dallas – Anthony Jones: 11 rec, 173 yards, 1 TD

=== Week 20: vs. Milwaukee Mustangs ===
Week 20: Milwaukee Mustangs at Chicago Rush – Game summary

Quarter	1	2	3	4	Total
Mustangs	9	21	14	10	54
Rush	6	14	7	14	41

at Allstate Arena, Rosemont, Illinois

- Date: July 23
- Game time: 7:00 p.m. CDT
- Game attendance: 10,269
- Referee: Jim Corpora
- Recap

Game information

1st quarter

- Milwaukee – (12:19) Broderick Stewart 0-yard fumble recovery (Garrett Lindholm kick failed), Milwaukee 6–0
- Milwaukee – (8:45) Garrett Lindholm 19-yard field goal, Milwaukee 9–0
- Chicago – (2:06) Reggie Gray 7-yard pass from J.J. Raterink (Chris Gould kick failed), Milwaukee 9–6

2nd quarter

- Milwaukee – (13:09) Ernest Smith 10-yard run (Garrett Lindholm kick), Milwaukee 16–6
- Milwaukee – (8:52) Mykel Benson 2-yard run (Garrett Lindholm kick), Milwaukee 23–6
- Milwaukee – (7:27) Broderick Stewart 0-yard fumble recovery (Garrett Lindholm kick), Milwaukee 30–6
- Chicago – (4:53) Reggie Gray 33-yard pass from Dominick Randolph (Chris Gould kick), Milwaukee 30–13
- Chicago – (0:14) Reggie Gray 9-yard pass from Dominick Randolph (Chris Gould kick), Milwaukee 30–20

3rd quarter

- Milwaukee – (13:58) Dwayne Eley Jr. 16-yard pass from Gino Guidugli (Garrett Lindholm kick), Milwaukee 37–20
- Milwaukee – (9:43) Victor Williams 31-yard pass from Gino Guidugli (Garrett Lindholm kick), Milwaukee 44–20
- Chicago – (3:46) Charles Dillon 1-yard run (Chris Gould kick), Milwaukee 44–27

4th quarter

- Milwaukee – (10:58) Garrett Lindholm 19-yard field goal, Milwaukee 47–27
- Chicago – (8:34) Reggie Gray 26-yard pass from J.J. Raterink (Chris Gould kick), Milwaukee 47–34
- Milwaukee – (4:42) Dwayne Eley Jr. 13-yard pass from Gino Guidugli (Garrett Lindholm kick), Milwaukee 54–34
- Chicago – (3:05) Reggie Gray 16-yard pass from Dominick Randolph (Chris Gould kick), Milwaukee 54–41

Passing

- Milwaukee – Gino Guidugli: 18/28, 193 yards, 3 TD, 1 INT
- Chicago – Dominic Randolph: 11/16, 167 yards, 3 TD, 2 INT

Rushing

- Milwaukee – Mykel Benson: 8 att, 17 yards, 1 TD
- Chicago – Johnie Kirton: 5 att, 7 yards

Receiving

- Milwaukee – Victor Williams: 5 rec, 60 yards, 1 TD
- Chicago – Reggie Gray: 9 rec, 123 yards, 5 TD

== Playoffs ==
=== National Conference Semifinals: vs. (3) Dallas Vigilantes ===
National Conference Semifinals: Dallas Vigilantes at Chicago Rush – Game summary

Quarter	1	2	3	4	Total
(3) Vigilantes	10	20	14	7	51
(2) Rush	7	20	7	20	54

at Allstate Arena, Rosemont, Illinois

- Date: July 29
- Game time: 7:30 p.m. CDT
- Game attendance: 4,489
- Referee: Shawn Hochuli
- Recap

Game information

1st quarter

- Chicago – (13:17) Reggie Gray 17-yard pass from J.J. Raterink (Chris Gould kick), Chicago 7–0
- Dallas – (9:53) Anthony Jones 10-yard pass from Dan Raudabaugh (Remy Hamilton kick), Tied 7–7
- Dallas – (2:29) Remy Hamilton 18-yard field goal, Dallas 10–7

2nd quarter

- Chicago – (14:09) Johnie Kirton 2-yard run (Chris Gould kick), Chicago 14–10
- Dallas – (13:01) Matt Fields 10-yard pass from Dan Raudabaugh (Remy Hamilton kick failed), Dallas 16–14
- Chicago – (9:26) Shatone Powers 22-yard pass from J.J. Raterink (Chris Gould kick failed), Chicago 20–16
- Dallas – (6:39) Matt Fields 21-yard pass from Dan Raudabaugh (Remy Hamilton kick), Dallas 23–20
- Chicago – (2:21) J.J. Raterink 8-yard run (Chris Gould kick), Chicago 27–23
- Dallas – (0:02) DeAndrew Rubin 2-yard pass from Dan Raudabaugh (Remy Hamilton kick), Dallas 30–27

3rd quarter

- Dallas – (11:39) Anthony Jones 13-yard pass from Dan Raudabaugh (Remy Hamilton kick), Dallas 37–27
- Chicago – (5:49) Charles Dillon 13-yard pass from J.J. Raterink (Chris Gould kick), Dallas 37–34
- Dallas – (0:51) Anthony Jones 6-yard pass from Dan Raudabaugh (Remy Hamilton kick), Dallas 44–34

4th quarter

- Chicago – (12:54) Reggie Gray 4-yard pass from J.J. Raterink (Chris Gould kick), Dallas 44–41
- Dallas – (9:10) Derrick Ross 3-yard run (Remy Hamilton kick), Dallas 51–41
- Chicago – (4:24) Charles Dillon 5-yard pass from J.J. Raterink (Chris Gould kick), Dallas 51–48
- Chicago – (3:46) Derek Lee 38-yard pass from J.J. Raterink (Chris Gould kick failed), Chicago 54–51

Passing

- Dallas – Dan Raudabaugh: 25/36, 256 yards, 6 TD
- Chicago – J.J. Raterink: 23/31, 287 yards, 6 TD

Rushing

- Dallas – Derrick Ross: 10 att, 50 yards, 1 TD
- Chicago – J.J. Raterink: 4 att, 22 yards, 1 TD

Receiving

- Dallas – Anthony Jones: 11 rec, 112 yards, 3 TD
- Chicago – Reggie Gray: 9 rec, 105 yards, 2 TD

=== National Conference Championship: at (1) Arizona Rattlers ===
National Conference Championship: Chicago Rush at Arizona Rattlers – Game summary

Quarter	1	2	3	4	Total
(2) Rush	6	13	0	29	48
(1) Rattlers	14	14	13	13	54

at US Airways Center, Phoenix, Arizona

- Date: August 6
- Game time: 9:00 p.m. CDT
- Game attendance: 6,886
- Referee: Alex Kemp
- Recap

Game information

1st quarter

- Arizona – (10:07) Chris Jackson 4-yard pass from Nick Davila (Jason Witczak kick), Arizona 7–0
- Chicago – (9:10) Jason Simpson 56-yard kickoff return (Chris Gould kick failed), Arizona 7–6
- Arizona – (5:23) Jason Geathers 14-yard pass from Nick Davila (Jason Witczak kick), Arizona 14–6

2nd quarter

- Chicago – (14:23) J.J. Raterink 1-yard run (Chris Gould rush failed), Arizona 14–12
- Arizona – (9:53) Jason Geathers 13-yard pass from Nick Davila (Jason Witczak kick), Arizona 21–12
- Chicago – (6:04) Reggie Gray 23-yard pass from J.J. Raterink (Chris Gould kick), Arizona 21–19
- Arizona – (0:36) Odie Armstrong 1-yard run (Jason Witczak kick), Arizona 28–19

3rd quarter

- Arizona – (8:31) Chris Jackson 11-yard pass from Nick Davila (Jason Witczak kick), Arizona 35–19
- Arizona – (5:18) Jason Geathers 7-yard pass from Nick Davila (Jason Witczak kick failed), Arizona 41–19

4th quarter

- Chicago – (13:15) Reggie Gray 30-yard pass from Dominic Randolph (Chris Gould kick), Arizona 41–26
- Chicago – (10:02) Marcus Waugh 4-yard run (J.J. Raterink pass), Arizona 41–34
- Arizona – (8:03) Jason Geathers 34-yard pass from Nick Davila (Jason Witczak kick), Arizona 48–34
- Chicago – (4:45) Reggie Gray 4-yard pass from J.J. Raterink (Chris Gould kick), Arizona 48–41
- Arizona – (3:10) Chris Jackson 5-yard pass from Nick Davila (Jason Witczak kick failed), Arizona 54–41
- Chicago – (0:06) Derek Lee 8-yard pass from J.J. Raterink (Chris Gould kick), Arizona 54–48

Passing

- Chicago – J.J. Raterink: 19/32, 187 yards, 3 TD, 2 INT
- Arizona – Nick Davila: 23/41, 283 yards, 7 TD, 1 INT

Rushing

- Chicago – Marcus Waugh: 1 att, 4 yards, 1 TD
- Arizona – Odie Armstrong: 4 att, 3 yards, 1 TD

Receiving

- Chicago – Reggie Gray: 7 rec, 101 yards, 3 TD
- Arizona – Jason Geathers: 10 rec, 150 yards, 4 TD
