= Lake McLeod (Florida) =

- Location within Florida Location within the United States
- Location: Eagle Lake, Florida
- Coordinates: 27.9680°N 81.7533°W
- Type: natural freshwater lake
- Basin countries: United States
- Max. length: 1.12 miles (1.80 km)
- Max. width: 0.8 miles (1.3 km)
- Surface area: 410 acres (166 ha)
- Average depth: 10.7 feet (3.3 m)
- Max. depth: 24.3 feet (7.4 m)
- Water volume: 1,891,093,274 US gallons (7.15856676×10^{9} L)
- Surface elevation: 135 feet (41 m)

Lake McLeod, sometimes also called McLeod Lake, is somewhat oval in shape. This lake is a natural freshwater lake with a 410-acre (1,700,000 m^{2}) surface area. Lake McLeod is bordered on the north by the town of Eagle Lake, Florida. Here it is bordered by residential areas. It is bordered on the northeast and east the lake is bordered by residences. On the south it is bordered by grassland and citrus orchards.

A municipal boat ramp is at the very north tip of Lake McLeod, on the south side of East Eagle Avenue. There are no public parks or swimming areas on the shores of this lake. The Hook and Bullet website says Lake McLeod contains largemouth bass, bluegill and crappie.
