= 2011 New Orleans VooDoo season =

Arena Football League team season

- Head coach: Derek Stingley (fired June 26); Jon Norris (interim)
- Home stadium: New Orleans Arena

Results
- Record: 3–15
- Division place: 5th
- Playoffs: Did not qualify

The 2011 New Orleans VooDoo season was the fifth season for the franchise in the Arena Football League. The team was coached by Derek Stingley until his firing on June 26. Jon Norris, who coached the Bossier–Shreveport Battle Wings in 2010, stepped down from his General Manager position with New Orleans to become the team's interim head coach. The VooDoo played their home games at New Orleans Arena. This was the first season for the VooDoo since 2008, after the league went on hiatus in 2009 and the franchise was not active in 2010. The VooDoo went 3–15, missing the playoffs, and finishing with the worst record in the league.

== Standings ==
South Division
Team	W	L	PCT	PF	PA	DIV	CON	Home	Away
z-Jacksonville Sharks	14	4	.778	1158	908	8–0	12–0	8–1	6–3
x-Georgia Force	11	7	.611	1007	931	7–5	5–3	5–4	6–3
x-Orlando Predators	11	7	.611	1001	933	4–4	8–4	6–3	5–4
Tampa Bay Storm	7	11	.389	802	993	2–6	4–8	4–5	3–6
New Orleans VooDoo	3	15	.167	826	1017	1–7	2–10	0–9	3–6

z - Clinched division and conference's best record
x - Clinched playoff berth

== Season schedule ==
=== Preseason ===
Day	Date	Kickoff	Opponent	Score	Location	Report
Friday	February 25	7:00 p.m. EST	Dallas Vigilantes	L 27–32	New Orleans Arena	

=== Regular season ===
The VooDoo began the season at home against the Tampa Bay Storm on March 11. They will visit the Orlando Predators in their final regular season game on July 23.

Week	Day	Date	Kickoff	Opponent	Results		Location	Report
Week	Day	Date	Kickoff	Opponent	Score	Record	Location	Report
1	Friday	March 11	7:00 p.m. CST	Tampa Bay Storm	L 40–46	0–1	New Orleans Arena	
2	Friday	March 18	7:00 p.m. CDT	Orlando Predators	L 34–47	0–2	New Orleans Arena	
3	Saturday	March 26	6:00 p.m. CDT	at Jacksonville Sharks	L 33–64	0–3	Jacksonville Veterans Memorial Arena	
4	Saturday	April 2	7:00 p.m. CDT	Georgia Force	L 35–61	0–4	New Orleans Arena	
5	Bye							
6	Friday	April 15	6:00 p.m. CDT	at Cleveland Gladiators	W 34–33	1–4	Quicken Loans Arena	
7	Friday	April 22	7:00 p.m. CDT	Pittsburgh Power	L 49–56	1–5	New Orleans Arena	
8	Saturday	April 30	7:00 p.m. CDT	at Chicago Rush	L 28–50	1–6	Allstate Arena	
9	Saturday	May 7	7:00 p.m. CDT	at Kansas City Command	W 59–52	2–6	Sprint Center	
10	Friday	May 13	7:00 p.m. CDT	Tulsa Talons	L 35–48	2–7	New Orleans Arena	
11	Friday	May 20	7:00 p.m. CDT	Arizona Rattlers	L 53–61	2–8	New Orleans Arena	
12	Friday	May 27	6:05 p.m. CDT	at Philadelphia Soul	L 49–70	2–9	Wells Fargo Center	
13	Friday	June 3	7:00 p.m. CDT	Jacksonville Sharks	L 55–62	2–10	New Orleans Arena	
14	Bye							
15	Friday	June 17	7:05 p.m. CDT	at Georgia Force	L 47–58	2–11	Arena at Gwinnett Center	
16	Saturday	June 25	7:00 p.m. CDT	Spokane Shock	L 54–75	2–12	New Orleans Arena	
17	Friday	July 1	6:30 p.m. CDT	at Tampa Bay Storm	W 64–33	3–12	St. Pete Times Forum	
18	Friday	July 8	7:00 p.m. CDT	Milwaukee Mustangs	L 55–76	3–13	New Orleans Arena	
19	Saturday	July 16	8:00 p.m. CDT	Utah Blaze	L 58–62	3–14	EnergySolutions Arena	
20	Saturday	July 23	6:30 p.m. CDT	at Orlando Predators	L 44–62	3–15	Amway Center	

== Regular season ==
=== Week 1: vs. Tampa Bay Storm ===
Week 1: Tampa Bay Storm at New Orleans VooDoo – Game summary

Quarter	1	2	3	4	Total
Storm	9	24	6	7	46
VooDoo	7	14	7	12	40

at New Orleans Arena, New Orleans, Louisiana

- Date: March 11
- Game time: 8:00 p.m. EST
- Referee: Scott Vaughn
- Recap

Game information

1st quarter

- Tampa Bay – (11:36) Team safety, Tampa Bay 2–0
- Tampa Bay – (6:41) Eric Ortiz 2-yard run (Kyle Chilton kick), Tampa Bay 9–0
- New Orleans – (1:59) Hutch Gonzalez 24-yard pass from Danny Wimprine (Jonathan Ruffin kick), Tampa Bay 9–7

2nd quarter

- Tampa Bay – (11:57) Grant Gregory 2-yard run (Kyle Chilton kick), Tampa Bay 16–7
- New Orleans – (9:00) Jason Schule 11-yard run (Jonathan Ruffin kick), Tampa Bay 16–14
- Tampa Bay – (4:55) Grant Gregory 1-yard run (Kyle Chilton kick), Tampa Bay 23–14
- Tampa Bay – (0:54) Kyle Chilton 29-yard field goal, Tampa Bay 26–14
- New Orleans – (0:46) P.J. Berry 57-yard kickoff return (Jonathan Ruffin kick), Tampa Bay 26–21
- Tampa Bay – (0:06) Michael Lindsey 3-yard run (Kyle Chilton kick), Tampa Bay 33–21

3rd quarter

- New Orleans – (2:54) P.J. Berry 10-yard pass from Danny Wimprine (Jonathan Ruffin kick), Tampa Bay 33–28
- Tampa Bay – (2:10) Michael Lindsey 57-yard kickoff return (Kyle Chilton kick failed), Tampa Bay 39–28

4th quarter

- New Orleans – (6:50) P.J. Berry 32-yard pass from Danny Wimprine (Danny Wimprine pass failed), Tampa Bay 39–34
- Tampa Bay – (0:56) Michael Lindsey 1-yard run (Kyle Chilton kick), Tampa Bay 46–34
- New Orleans – (0:00) P.J. Berry 1-yard run, Tampa Bay 46–40

Passing

- Tampa Bay – Mike Potts: 20/35, 165 yards
- New Orleans – Danny Wimprine: 20/29, 230 yards, 3 TD, 1 INT

Rushing

- Tampa Bay – Michael Lindsey: 3 att, 2 yards, 2 TD
- New Orleans – Jason Schule: 5 att, 32 yards, 1 TD

Receiving

- Tampa Bay – Huey Whittaker: 6 rec, 80 yards
- New Orleans – Hutch Gonzales: 9 rec, 108 yards, 1 TD

=== Week 2: vs. Orlando Predators ===
Week 2: Orlando Predators at New Orleans VooDoo – Game summary

Quarter	1	2	3	4	Total
Predators	7	14	13	13	47
VooDoo	7	7	14	6	34

at New Orleans Arena, New Orleans, Louisiana

- Date: March 18
- Game time: 7:00 p.m. CDT
- Game attendance: 8,543
- Recap

Game information

1st quarter

- New Orleans – (13:14) Jason Schule 6-yard run (Jonathan Ruffin kick), New Orleans 7–0
- Orlando – (5:25) T.T. Toliver 13-yard pass from Nick Hill (Mark Lewis kick), Tied 7–7

2nd quarter

- Orlando – (13:00) Nick Hill 3-yard run (Mark Lewis kick), Orlando 14–7
- Orlando – (7:00) T.T. Toliver 10-yard pass from Nick Hill (Mark Lewis kick), Orlando 21–7
- New Orleans – (1:12) Carlese Franklin 11-yard pass from Danny Wimprine (Jonathan Ruffin kick), Orlando 21–14

3rd quarter

- Orlando – (10:35) Marlon Moye-Moore 2-yard run (Mark Lewis kick failed), Orlando 27–14
- New Orleans – (8:46) P.J. Berry 24-yard pass from Danny Wimprine (Jonathan Ruffin kick), Orlando 27–21
- Orlando – (7:00) Doug Gabriel 3-yard pass from Nick Hill (Mark Lewis kick), Orlando 34–21
- New Orleans – (1:12) P.J. Berry 36-yard pass from Danny Wimprine (Jonathan Ruffin kick), Orlando 34–28

4th quarter

- Orlando – (10:56) Robert Quiroga 36-yard pass from Nick Hill (Mark Lewis kick failed), Orlando 40–28
- Orlando – (0:55) Nick Hill 6-yard run (Mark Lewis kick), Orlando 47–28
- New Orleans – (0:00) P.J. Berry 4-yard pass from Danny Wimprine, Orlando 47–34

Passing

- Orlando – Nick Hill: 25/36, 290 yards, 4 TD, 1 INT
- New Orleans – Danny Wimprine: 16/28, 223 yards, 4 TD, 2 INT

Rushing

- Orlando – Nick Hill: 11 att, 44 yards, 2 TD
- New Orleans – Jason Schule: 5 att, 21 yards, 1 TD

Receiving

- Orlando – T.T. Toliver: 13 rec, 146 yards, 2 TD
- New Orleans – P.J. Berry: 8 rec, 118 yards, 3 TD

=== Week 3: at Jacksonville Sharks ===
Week 3: New Orleans VooDoo at Jacksonville Sharks – Game summary

Quarter	1	2	3	4	Total
VooDoo	6	13	7	7	33
Sharks	13	19	13	19	64

at Jacksonville Veterans Memorial Arena, Jacksonville, Florida

- Date: March 26
- Game time: 6:00 p.m. CDT
- Recap

Game information

1st quarter

- New Orleans – (13:48) Carlese Franklin 30 yd pass from Danny Wimprine (Jonathan Ruffin kick failed), New Orleans 6–0
- Jacksonville – (13:03) Jomo Wilson 45 yd pass from Aaron Garcia (Marco Capozzoli kick failed), Tied 6–6
- Jacksonville – (4:02) Jeron Harvey 14 yd pass from Aaron Garcia (Marco Capozzoli kick), Jacksonville 13–6

2nd quarter

- Jacksonville – (13:12) Jomo Wilson 22 yd pass from Aaron Garcia (Marco Capozzoli kick failed), Jacksonville 19–6
- New Orleans – (9:58) Carlese Franklin 29 yd pass from Danny Wimprine (Jonathan Ruffin kick failed), Jacksonville 19–12
- Jacksonville – (6:53) Sale' Key 19 yd pass from Aaron Garcia (Marco Capozzoli kick), Jacksonville 26–12
- New Orleans – (2:42) Moqut Ruffins 24 yd pass from Danny Wimprine (Jonathan Ruffin kick), Jacksonville 26–19
- Jacksonville – (1:29) Jeron Harvey 20 yd pass from Aaron Garcia (Marco Capozzoli kick failed), Jacksonville 32–19

3rd quarter

- Jacksonville – (12:26) Jeron Harvey 36 yd pass from Aaron Garcia (Marco Capozzoli kick), Jacksonville 39–19
- New Orleans – (6:14) P.J. Berry 26 yd pass from Danny Wimprine (Jonathan Ruffin kick), Jacksonville 39–26
- Jacksonville – (4:48) Jomo Wilson 48 yd pass from Aaron Garcia (Marco Capozzoli kick failed), Jacksonville 45–26

4th quarter

- Jacksonville – (14:25) Sale' Key 15 yd pass from Aaron Garcia (Marco Capozzoli kick failed), Jacksonville 51–26
- New Orleans – (11:46) Carlese Franklin 30 yd pass from Derek Cassidy (Jonathan Ruffin kick), Jacksonville 51–33
- Jacksonville – (10:59) Sale' Key 12 yd kickoff return (Kirby Griffin rush failed), Jacksonville 57–33
- Jacksonville – (0:11) Jeron Harvey 34 yd pass from Omar Jacobs (Marco Capozzoli kick), Jacksonville 64–33

Passing

- New Orleans – Danny Wimprine: 13/29, 180 yards, 4 TD, 1 INT
- Jacksonville – Aaron Garcia: 17/19, 308 yards, 8 TD

Rushing

- New Orleans – Jason Schule: 6 att, 15 yards
- Jacksonville – Jeron Harvey: 1 rec, 5 yards

Receiving

- New Orleans – Carlese Franklin: 5 rec, 104 yards, 3 TD
- Jacksonville – Jomo Wilson: 4 rec, 120 yards, 3 TD

=== Week 4: vs. Georgia Force ===
Week 4: Georgia Force at New Orleans VooDoo – Game summary

Quarter	1	2	3	4	Total
Force	14	28	13	6	61
VooDoo	7	7	13	8	35

at New Orleans Arena, New Orleans, Louisiana

- Date: April 2
- Game time: 7:00 p.m. CDT
- Game attendance: 8,282
- Referee: Chris Sead
- Recap

Game information

1st quarter

- Georgia – (12:51) Maurice Purify 14-yard pass from Brett Elliott (Carlos Martinez kick), Georgia 7–0
- Georgia – (9:52) Ryan Bowers 4-yard run (Carlos Martinez kick), Georgia 14–0
- New Orleans – (5:00) P.J. Berry 6-yard run (Jonathan Ruffin kick), Georgia 14–7

2nd quarter

- Georgia – (14:52) C.J. Johnson 2-yard pass from Brett Elliot (Carlos Martinez kick), Georgia 21–7
- Georgia – (10:29) Maurice Purify 5-yard pass from Brett Elliott (Carlos Martinez kick), Georgia 28–7
- Georgia – (7:55) Mike Johnson 5-yard pass from Brett Elliot (Carlos Martinez kick), Georgia 35–7
- New Orleans – (2:05) Joe Holmes 0-yard fumble recovery (Jonathan Ruffin kick), Georgia 35–14
- Georgia – (0:06) Brett Elliott 1-yard run (Carlos Martinez kick), Georgia 42–14

3rd quarter

- New Orleans – (13:48) Derrick Lewis 12-yard pass from Danny Wimprine (Jonathan Ruffin kick failed), Georgia 42–20
- Georgia – (10:38) Larry Shipp 1-yard run (Carlos Martinez kick failed), Georgia 48–20
- New Orleans – (4:21) Carlese Franklin 6-yard pass from Danny Wimprine (Jonathan Ruffin kick), Georgia 48–27
- Georgia – (3:02) Larry Shipp 19-yard pass from Brett Elliott (Carlos Martinez kick), Georgia 55–27

4th quarter

- Georgia – (11:57) Larry Shipp 22-yard pass from Brett Elliott (Darnell Kennedy rush failed), Georgia 61–27
- New Orleans – (7:28) Eric Scott 17-yard interception return (Derek Cassidy pass), Georgia 61–35

Passing

- Georgia – Brett Elliott: 16/22, 217 yards, 6 TD
- New Orleans – Danny Wimprine: 18/34, 184 yards, 2 TD, 4 INT

Rushing

- Georgia – Ryan Bowers: 2 att, 3 yards, 1 TD
- New Orleans – James Harris: 2 att, 14 yards

Receiving

- Georgia – Maurice Purify: 12 rec, 156 yards, 2 TD
- New Orleans – Carlese Franklin: 7 rec, 89 yards, 1 TD

=== Week 6: at Cleveland Gladiators ===
Week 6: New Orleans VooDoo at Cleveland Gladiators – Game summary

Quarter	1	2	3	4	Total
VooDoo	14	6	7	7	34
Gladiators	6	20	7	0	33

at Quicken Loans Arena, Cleveland, Ohio

- Date: April 15
- Game time: 6:00 p.m. CDT
- Game attendance: 7,123
- Referee: Alex Kemp
- Recap

Game information

1st quarter

- New Orleans – (10:25) Tom Taggart 2-yard run (Jonathan Ruffin kick), New Orleans 7–0
- New Orleans – (8:44) Danny Wimprine 6-yard run (Jonathan Ruffin kick), New Orleans 14–0
- Cleveland – (6:13) Russell Monk 4-yard run (Matt Denny kick failed), New Orleans 14–6

2nd quarter

- Cleveland – (8:46) Russell Monk 1-yard run (Matt Denny kick), New Orleans 14–13
- Cleveland – (4:48) Troy Bergeron 8-yard pass from Kurt Rocco (Matt Denny kick), Cleveland 20–14
- New Orleans – (3:00) Chris Wilson 45-yard pass from Danny Wimprine (Jonathan Ruffin kick blocked), Tied 20–20
- Cleveland – (0:08) Russell Monk 2-yard run (Matt Denny kick failed), Cleveland 26–20

3rd quarter

- New Orleans – (11:20) Carlese Franklin 3-yard pass from Danny Wimprine (Jonathan Ruffin kick), New Orleans 27–26
- Cleveland – (9:46) Kurt Rocco 1-yard run (Matt Denny kick), Cleveland 33–27

4th quarter

- New Orleans – (4:03) James Jordan 8-yard pass from Danny Wimprine (Jonathan Ruffin kick), New Orleans 34–33

Passing

- New Orleans – Danny Wimprine: 22/36, 200 yards, 3 TD, 1 INT
- Cleveland – Kurt Rocco: 19/31, 217 yards, 1 TD, 2 INT

Rushing

- New Orleans – Danny Wimprine: 3 att, 15 yards, 1 TD
- Cleveland – Russell Monk: 4 rec, 8 yards, 3 TD

Receiving

- New Orleans – P.J. Berry: 10 rec, 79 yards
- Cleveland – Troy Bergeron: 11 rec, 117 yards, 1 TD

=== Week 7: vs. Pittsburgh Power ===
Week 7: Pittsburgh Power at New Orleans VooDoo – Game summary

Quarter	1	2	3	4	Total
Power	0	14	14	28	56
VooDoo	7	7	7	28	49

at New Orleans Arena, New Orleans, Louisiana

- Date: April 22
- Game time: 7:00 p.m. CDT
- Game attendance: 6,937
- Referee: Scott Vaughn
- Recap

Game information

1st quarter

- New Orleans – (0:00) James Jordan 5-yard pass from Danny Wimprine (Jonathan Ruffin kick), New Orleans 7–0

2nd quarter

- New Orleans – (3:12) P.J. Berry 26-yard pass from Danny Wimprine (Jonathan Ruffin kick), New Orleans 14–0
- Pittsburgh – (1:00) Jason Willis 12-yard pass from Anthony Morelli (Paul Edinger kick), New Orleans 14–7
- Pittsburgh – (0:45) Jason Willis 11-yard pass from Anthony Morelli (Paul Edinger kick), Tied 14–14

3rd quarter

- Pittsburgh – (12:29) Lonnell Dewalt 17-yard pass from Anthony Morelli (Paul Edinger kick), Pittsburgh 21–14
- New Orleans – (10:05) James Jordan 33-yard pass from Danny Wimprine (Jonathan Ruffin kick), Tied 21–21
- Pittsburgh – (6:00) Xavier Lee 11-yard pass from Anthony Morelli (Paul Edinger kick), Pittsburgh 28–21

4th quarter

- Pittsburgh – (13:30) Anthony Morelli 1-yard run (Paul Edinger kick), Pittsburgh 35–21
- New Orleans – (12:51) P.J. Berry 58-yard kickoff return (Jonathan Ruffin kick), Pittsburgh 35–28
- Pittsburgh – (9:01) Michael Washington 31-yard pass from Anthony Morelli (Paul Edinger kick), Pittsburgh 42–28
- New Orleans – (7:53) James Jordan 14-yard pass from Danny Wimprine (Jonathan Ruffin kick), Pittsburgh 42–35
- Pittsburgh – (5:23) Lonnell Dewalt 8-yard pass from Anthony Morelli (Paul Edinger kick), Pittsburgh 49–35
- New Orleans – (3:35) Chris Wilson 31-yard pass from Danny Wimprine (Jonathan Ruffin kick), Pittsburgh 49–42
- Pittsburgh – (2:28) Xavier Lee 4-yard run (Paul Edinger kick), Pittsburgh 56–42
- New Orleans – (0:22) P.J. Berry 3-yard pass from Danny Wimprine (Jonathan Ruffin kick), Pittsburgh 56–49

Passing

- Pittsburgh – Anthony Morelli: 23/35, 232 yards, 6 TD, 1 INT
- New Orleans – Danny Wimprine: 25/40, 279 yards, 6 TD, 1 INT

Rushing

- Pittsburgh – Anthony Morelli: 7 att, 45 yards, 1 TD
- New Orleans – Tom Taggart: 3 att, 18 yards

Receiving

- Pittsburgh – Jason Willis: 8 rec, 87 yards, 2 TD
- New Orleans – James Jordan: 5 rec, 76 yards, 3 TD

=== Week 8: at Chicago Rush ===
Week 8: New Orleans VooDoo at Chicago Rush – Game summary

Quarter	1	2	3	4	Total
VooDoo	7	7	0	14	28
Rush	23	13	14	0	50

at Allstate Arena, Rosemont, Illinois

- Date: April 30
- Game time: 7:00 p.m. CDT
- Game attendance: 9,018
- Referee: Tom McCabe
- Recap

Game information

1st quarter

- Chicago – (12:07) Brett McDermott 9-yard pass from Russ Michna (Chris Gould kick), Chicago 7–0
- New Orleans – (9:30) Lucas Taylor 32-yard pass from Chris Wallace (Jonathan Ruffin kick), Tied 7–7
- Chicago – (5:46) Quartez Vickerson safety, Chicago 9–7
- Chicago – (3:59) Todd Devoe 5-yard pass from Russ Michna (Chris Gould kick), Chicago 16–7
- Chicago – (1:07) Charles Dillon 10-yard pass from Russ Michna (Chris Gould kick), Chicago 23–7

2nd quarter

- New Orleans – (3:38) P.J. Berry 4-yard run (Jonathan Ruffin kick), Chicago 23–14
- Chicago – (2:41) Reggie Gray 36-yard pass from Russ Michna (Chris Gould kick failed), Chicago 29–14
- Chicago – (0:16) Reggie Gray 45-yard pass from Russ Michna (Chris Gould kick), Chicago 36–14

3rd quarter

- Chicago – (6:28) Reggie Gray 14-yard pass from Russ Michna (Chris Gould kick), Chicago 43–14
- Chicago – (4:28) Vic Hall 18-yard interception return (Chris Gould kick), Chicago 50–14

4th quarter

- New Orleans – (13:22) P.J. Berry 1-yard run (Jonathan Ruffin kick), Chicago 50–21
- New Orleans – (7:19) P.J. Berry 4-yard pass from Danny Wimprine (Jonathan Ruffin kick), Chicago 50–28

Passing

- New Orleans – Chris Wallace: 18/33, 168 yards, 1 TD, 3 INT
- Chicago – Russ Michna: 17/22, 213 yards, 6 TD

Rushing

- New Orleans – P.J. Berry: 2 att, 5 yards, 2 TD
- Chicago – Johnie Kirton: 6 att, 33 yards

Receiving

- New Orleans – P.J. Berry: 12 rec, 132 yards, 1 TD
- Chicago – Reggie Gray: 4 rec, 52 yards, 1 TD

=== Week 9: at Kansas City Command ===
Week 9: New Orleans VooDoo at Kansas City Command – Game summary

Quarter	1	2	3	4	Total
VooDoo	17	14	7	21	59
Command	7	21	14	10	52

at Sprint Center, Kansas City, Missouri

- Date: May 7
- Game time: 7:00 p.m. CDT
- Game attendance: 4,422
- Referee: Larry Smith
- Recap

Game information

1st quarter

- New Orleans – (5:30) Jonathan Ruffin 32-yard field goal, New Orleans 3–0
- New Orleans – (5:00) James Harris 2-yard run (Jonathan Ruffin kick), New Orleans 10–0
- Kansas City – (3:06) Bret Smith 19-yard pass from J.J. Raterink (Brian Umstead kick), New Orleans 10–7
- New Orleans – (0:00) Tom Taggert 13-yard run (Jonathan Ruffin kick), New Orleans 17–7

2nd quarter

- Kansas City – (12:04) Bret Smith 16-yard pass from J.J. Raterink (Brian Umstead kick), New Orleans 17–14
- New Orleans – (10:55) James Jordan 45-yard pass from Chris Wallace (Jonathan Ruffin kick), New Orleans 24–14
- Kansas City – (1:48) Erick Harris 27-yard interception return (Brian Umstead kick), New Orleans 24–21
- New Orleans – (0:27) Chris Wilson 14-yard pass from Chris Wallace (Jonathan Ruffin kick), New Orleans 31–21
- Kansas City – (0:00) Christian Wise 4-yard pass from J.J. Raterink (Brian Umstead kick), New Orleans 31–28

3rd quarter

- Kansas City – (13:17) Victor Mann 1-yard run (Brian Umstead kick), Kansas City 35–31
- New Orleans – (9:24) Tom Taggert 1-yard run (Jonathan Ruffin kick), New Orleans 38–35
- Kansas City – (6:45) Aaron Hosack 8-yard pass from J.J. Raterink (Brian Umstead kick), Kansas City 42–38

4th quarter

- Kansas City – (13:17) Brian Umstead 32-yard field goal, Kansas City 45–38
- New Orleans – (12:21) James Jordan 31-yard pass from Chris Wallace (Jonathan Ruffin kick), Tied 45–45
- New Orleans – (8:33) Jerron Wishom 54-yard interception return (Jonathan Ruffin kick), New Orleans 52–45
- Kansas City – (4:10) Christian Wise 3-yard run (Brian Umstead kick), Tied 52–52
- New Orleans – (2:45) Chris Wilson 38-yard pass from Chris Wallace (Jonathan Ruffin kick), New Orleans 59–52

Passing

- New Orleans – Chris Wallace: 20/32, 250 yards, 4 TD, 1 INT
- Kansas City – J.J. Raterink: 27/40, 324 yards, 4 TD, 2 INT

Rushing

- New Orleans – Tom Taggert: 3 att, 14 yards, 2 TD
- Kansas City – Victor Mann: 4 rec, 3 yards, 1 TD

Receiving

- New Orleans – Jordan James: 8 rec, 123 yards, 2 TD
- Kansas City – Bret Smith: 11 rec, 133 yards, 2 TD

=== Week 10: vs. Tulsa Talons ===
Week 10: Tulsa Talons at New Orleans VooDoo – Game summary

Quarter	1	2	3	4	Total
Talons	7	17	7	17	48
VooDoo	0	21	7	7	35

at New Orleans Arena, New Orleans, Louisiana

- Date: May 13
- Game time: 7:00 p.m. CDT
- Game attendance: 8,127
- Referee: Scott Vaughn
- Recap

Game information

1st quarter

- Tulsa – (6:55) Brandon Copeland 8-yard pass from Matt Bassuener (Juan Bongarra kick), Tulsa 7–0

2nd quarter

- Tulsa – (14:54) Matt Bassuener 1-yard run (Juan Bongarra kick), Tulsa 14–0
- New Orleans – (10:18) P.J. Berry 7-yard pass from Danny Wimprine (Jonathan Ruffin kick), Tulsa 14–7
- New Orleans – (4:42) P.J. Berry 14-yard pass from Danny Wimprine (Jonathan Ruffin kick), Tied 14–14
- Tulsa – (1:06) Brandon Copeland 34-yard pass from Matt Bassuener (Juan Bongarra kick), Tulsa 21–14
- New Orleans – (0:45) P.J. Berry 7-yard pass from Danny Wimprine (Jonathan Ruffin kick), Tied 21–21
- Tulsa – (0:06) Juan Bongarra 24-yard field goal, Tulsa 24–21

3rd quarter

- Tulsa – (8:34) Troy McBroom 10-yard pass from Matt Bassuener (Juan Bongarra kick), Tulsa 31–21
- New Orleans – (1:57) James Jordan 3-yard pass from Danny Wimprine (Jonathan Ruffin kick), Tulsa 31–28

4th quarter

- Tulsa – (13:05) Brandon Copeland 14-yard pass from Matt Bassuener (Juan Bongarra kick), Tulsa 38–28
- New Orleans – (10:03) P.J. Berry 30-yard pass from Danny Wimprine (Jonathan Ruffin kick), Tulsa 38–35
- Tulsa – (5:12) Matt Bassuener 1-yard run (Juan Bongarra kick), Tulsa 45–35
- Tulsa – (0:48) Juan Bongarra 16-yard field goal, Tulsa 48–35

Passing

- Tulsa – Matt Bassuener: 24/35, 225 yards, 4 TD, 1 INT
- New Orleans – Danny Wimprine: 26/47, 234 yards, 5 TD, 1 INT

Rushing

- Tulsa – Matt Bassuener: 14 att, 55 yards, 2 TD
- New Orleans – Tom Taggart: 3 att, 7 yards

Receiving

- Tulsa – Troy McBroom: 10 rec, 96 yards, 3 TD
- New Orleans – James Jordan: 13 rec, 129 yards, 4 TD

=== Week 11: vs. Arizona Rattlers ===
Week 11: Arizona Rattlers at New Orleans VooDoo – Game summary

Quarter	1	2	3	4	Total
Rattlers	21	19	7	14	61
VooDoo	19	14	7	13	53

at New Orleans Arena, New Orleans, Louisiana

- Date: May 20
- Game time: 7:00 p.m. CDT
- Game attendance: 8,257
- Referee: Chris Snead
- Recap

Game information

1st quarter

- New Orleans – (13:41) P.J. Berry 42-yard pass from D. Bryant (Jonathan Ruffin kick), New Orleans 7–0
- Arizona – (11:48) Trandon Harvey 25-yard pass from Nick Davila (Fabrizio Scaccia kick), Tied 7–7
- New Orleans – (11:11) Chris Wilson 30-yard pass from D. Bryant (Jonathan Ruffin kick blocked), New Orleans 13–7
- Arizona – (9:18) Jason Geathers 9-yard pass from Nick Davila (Fabrizio Scaccia kick), Arizona 14–13
- New Orleans – (5:14) Chris Wilson 16-yard pass from D. Bryant (Danny Wimprine rush failed), New Orleans 19–14
- Arizona – (2:12) Rod Windsor 4-yard pass from Nick Davila (Fabrizio Scaccia kick), Arizona 21–19

2nd quarter

- Arizona – (10:35) Trandon Harvey 5-yard pass from Nick Davila (Fabrizio Scaccia kick failed), Arizona 27–19
- New Orleans – (9:38) P.J. Berry 57-yard kickoff return (Jonathan Ruffin kick), Arizona 27–26
- Arizona – (7:04) Trandon Harvey 15-yard pass from Nick Davila (Fabrizio Scaccia kick blocked), Arizona 33–26
- New Orleans – (4:03) Chris Wilson 2-yard pass from D. Bryant (Jonathan Ruffin kick), Tied 33–33
- Arizona – (3:07) Trandon Harvey 45-yard kickoff return (Fabrizio Scaccia kick), Arizona 40–33

3rd quarter

- New Orleans – (6:22) P.J. Berry 29-yard pass from D. Bryant (Jonathan Ruffin kick), Tied 40–40
- Arizona – (1:22) Trandon Harvey 17-yard pass from Nick Davila (Fabrizio Scaccia kick), Arizona 47–40

4th quarter

- Arizona – (8:19) Rod Windsor 20-yard pass from Nick Davila (Fabrizio Scaccia kick), Arizona 54–40
- New Orleans – (4:58) P.J. Berry 13-yard pass from D. Bryant (Jonathan Ruffin kick), Arizona 54–47
- Arizona – (4:00) Marquis Floyd 10-yard kickoff return (Fabrizio Scaccia kick), Arizona 61–47
- New Orleans – (0:51) D. Bryant 1-yard run (Jonathan Ruffin kick failed), Arizona 61–53

Passing

- Arizona – Nick Davila: 26/31, 314 yards, 7 TD
- New Orleans – D. Bryant: 25/34, 285 yards, 6 TD, 3 INT

Rushing

- Arizona – Odie Armstrong: 4 att, 7 yards
- New Orleans – D. Bryant: 5 att, 26 yards, 1 TD

Receiving

- Arizona – Rod Windsor: 13 rec, 162 yards, 2 TD
- New Orleans – P.J. Berry: 12 rec, 154 yards, 3 TD

=== Week 12: at Philadelphia Soul ===
Week 12: New Orleans VooDoo at Philadelphia Soul – Game summary

Quarter	1	2	3	4	Total
VooDoo	6	17	20	6	49
Soul	7	34	14	15	70

at Wells Fargo Center, Philadelphia, Pennsylvania

- Date: May 27
- Game time: 6:05 p.m. CDT
- Game attendance: 7,626
- Referee: Tom McCabe
- Recap

Game information

1st quarter

- New Orleans – (14:23) Matt Jackson 16-yard interception return (Jonathan Ruffin kick failed), New Orleans 6–0
- Philadelphia – (5:13) Darnell Whitley 6-yard run (Jon Strictsky kick), Philadelphia 7–6

2nd quarter

- Philadelphia – (14:56) Ryan Vena 2-yard run (Jon Strictsky kick), Philadelphia 14–6
- New Orleans – (11:33) Jonathan Ruffin 46-yard field goal, Philadelphia 14–9
- Philadelphia – (9:26) Larry Brackins 7-yard pass from Ryan Vena (Jon Strictsky kick), Philadelphia 21–9
- New Orleans – (5:22) P.J. Berry 13-yard pass from D. Bryant (Jonathan Ruffin kick), Philadelphia 21–16
- Philadelphia – (2:49) Syvelle Newton 6-yard pass from Ryan Vena (Jon Strictsky kick), Philadelphia 28–16
- Philadelphia – (0:38) Syvelle Newton 1-yard run (Jon Strictsky kick), Philadelphia 35–16
- New Orleans – (0:31) P.J. Berry 55-yard kickoff return (Jonathan Ruffin kick), Philadelphia 35–23
- Philadelphia – (0:09) Darnell Whitley 1-yard run (Jon Strictsky kick failed), Philadelphia 41–23

3rd quarter

- New Orleans – (12:26) Alvin Jackson 10-yard interception return (Danny Wimprine rush failed), Philadelphia 41–29
- Philadelphia – (9:01) Donovan Morgan 15-yard pass from Ryan Vena (Jon Strictsky kick), Philadelphia 48–29
- New Orleans – (7:43) Hutch Gonzales 10-yard pass from D. Bryant (Jonathan Ruffin kick), Philadelphia 48–36
- Philadelphia – (5:49) Donovan Morgan 15-yard pass from Ryan Vena (Jon Strictsky kick), Philadelphia 55–36
- New Orleans – (2:50) P.J. Berry 9-yard pass from D. Bryant (Jonathan Ruffin kick), Philadelphia 55–43

4th quarter

- Philadelphia – (11:12) Donovan Morgan 5 yd pass from Ryan Vena (Jon Strictsky kick), Philadelphia 62–43
- Philadelphia – (9:03) Team safety, Philadelphia 64–43
- Philadelphia – (4:16) Syvelle Newton 4-yard pass from Ryan Vena (Jon Strictsky kick failed), Philadelphia 70–43
- New Orleans – (0:50) Tom Taggert 3-yard run (Jonathan Ruffin kick failed), Philadelphia 70–49

Passing

- New Orleans – D. Bryant: 14/26, 157 yards, 3 TD, 2 INT
- Philadelphia – Ryan Vena: 22/33, 291 yards, 6 TD, 2 INT

Rushing

- New Orleans – Tom Taggert: 1 att, 2 yards, 1 TD
- Philadelphia – Darnell Whitley: 8 att, 20 yards, 2 TD

Receiving

- New Orleans – P.J. Berry: 6 rec, 70 yards, 2 TD
- Philadelphia – Donovan Morgan: 8 rec, 117 yards, 3 TD

=== Week 13: vs. Jacksonville Sharks ===
Week 13: Jacksonville Sharks at New Orleans VooDoo – Game summary

Quarter	1	2	3	4	Total
Sharks	14	28	6	14	62
VooDoo	7	21	14	13	55

at New Orleans Arena, New Orleans, Louisiana

- Date: June 3
- Game time: 7:00 p.m. CDT
- Game attendance: 8,500
- Referee: David Cutaia
- Recap

Game information

1st quarter

- Jacksonville – (12:35) Kirby Griffin 1-yard run (Marco Capozzoli kick), Jacksonville 7–0
- New Orleans – (8:36) P.J. Berry 1-yard run (Jonathan Ruffin kick), Tied 7–7
- Jacksonville – (6:00) Jeron Harvey 3-yard pass from Aaron Garcia (Marco Capozzoli kick), Jacksonville 14–7

2nd quarter

- Jacksonville – (14:52) Jeron Harvey 19-yard pass from Aaron Garcia (Marco Capozzoli kick), Jacksonville 21–7
- New Orleans – (12:30) Skyler Green 25-yard pass from D. Bryant (Jonathan Ruffin kick), Jacksonville 21–14
- Jacksonville – (10:59) Jomo Wilson 12-yard pass from Aaron Garcia (Marco Capozzoli kick), Jacksonville 28–14
- Jacksonville – (9:04) Jeff Hughley 24-yard pass from Aaron Garcia (Marco Capozzoli kick), Jacksonville 35–14
- New Orleans – (8:12) Skyler Green 57-yard kickoff return (Jonathan Ruffin kick), Jacksonville 35–21
- Jacksonville – (6:31) Kirby Griffin 1-yard run (Marco Capozzoli kick), Jacksonville 42–21
- New Orleans – (0:22) Moqut Ruffins 3-yard pass from Danny Wimprine (Jonathan Ruffin kick), Jacksonville 42–28

3rd quarter

- New Orleans – (8:10) Skyler Green 42-yard pass from Danny Wimprine (Jonathan Ruffin kick), Jacksonville 42–35
- Jacksonville – (6:07) Jeron Harvey 26-yard pass from Aaron Garcia (Marco Capozzoli kick failed), Jacksonville 48–35
- New Orleans – (1:03) James Jordan 22-yard pass from Danny Wimprine (Jonathan Ruffin kick), Jacksonville 48–42

4th quarter

- Jacksonville – (12:12) Kirby Griffin 1-yard run (Marco Capozzoli kick), Jacksonville 55–42
- Jacksonville – (5:36) Kirby Griffin 1-yard run (Marco Capozzoli kick), Jacksonville 62–42
- New Orleans – (2:22) Skyler Green 9-yard pass from Danny Wimprine (Jonathan Ruffin kick), Jacksonville 62–49
- New Orleans – (0:05) Skyler Green 18-yard pass from Danny Wimprine (Jonathan Ruffin kick failed), Jacksonville 62–55

Passing

- Jacksonville – Aaron Garcia: 21/29, 240 yards, 5 TD, 1 INT
- New Orleans – Danny Wimprine: 17/30, 194 yards, 5 TD

Rushing

- Jacksonville – Kirby Griffin: 8 att, 7 yards, 4 TD
- New Orleans – Tom Taggert: 2 att, 25 yards

Receiving

- Jacksonville – Jeron Harvey: 9 rec, 106 yards, 3 TD
- New Orleans – Skyler Green: 8 rec, 132 yards, 4 TD

=== Week 15: at Georgia Force ===
Week 15: New Orleans VooDoo at Georgia Force – Game summary

Quarter	1	2	3	4	Total
VooDoo	7	13	7	20	47
Force	7	17	21	13	58

at Arena at Gwinnett Center, Duluth, Georgia

- Date: June 17
- Game time: 7:05 p.m. CDT
- Game attendance: 4,009
- Referee: Joe Pester
- Recap

Game information

1st quarter

- New Orleans – (6:17) Tom Taggert 15-yard run (Jonathan Ruffin kick), New Orleans 7–0
- Georgia – (2:37) Maurice Purify 19-yard pass from Brett Elliott (Carlos Martinez kick), Tied 7–7

2nd quarter

- Georgia – (14:18) Carlos Martinez 29-yard field goal, Georgia 10–7
- New Orleans – (9:43) Lucas Taylor 11-yard pass from D. Bryant (Jonathan Ruffin kick), New Orleans 14–10
- Georgia – (8:50) C.J. Johnson 56-yard kickoff return (Carlos Martinez kick), Georgia 17–14
- New Orleans – (0:49) P.J. Berry 2-yard run (Jonathan Ruffin kick failed), New Orleans 20–17
- Georgia – (0:14) Maurice Purify 15-yard pass from Brett Elliott (Carlos Martinez kick), Georgia 24–20

3rd quarter

- Georgia – (14:24) Ahmad Hawkins 4-yard interception return (Carlos Martinez kick), Georgia 31–20
- New Orleans – (12:17) Skyler Green 5-yard pass from Danny Wimprine (Jonathan Ruffin kick), Georgia 31–27
- Georgia – (10:12) Mike Johnson 4-yard pass from Brett Elliott (Carlos Martinez kick), Georgia 38–27
- Georgia – (4:40) Maurice Purify 16-yard pass from Brett Elliott (Carlos Martinez kick), Georgia 45–27

4th quarter

- New Orleans – (9:09) Skyler Green 2-yard pass from D. Bryant (Jonathan Ruffin kick), Georgia 45–34
- New Orleans – (7:55) Tom Taggert 2-yard run (Jonathan Ruffin kick blocked), Georgia 45–40
- Georgia – (4:09) Maurice Purify 10-yard pass from Brett Elliott (Carlos Martinez kick), Georgia 52–40
- New Orleans – (1:36) D. Bryant 2-yard run (Jonathan Ruffin kick), Georgia 52–47
- Georgia – (0:48) Mike Johnson 7-yard pass from Brett Elliott, Georgia 58–47

Passing

- New Orleans – D. Bryant: 21/34, 239 yards, 2 TD, 1 INT
- Georgia – Brett Elliott: 19/33, 179 yards, 6 TD, 1 INT

Rushing

- New Orleans – Tom Taggert: 7 att, 38 yards, 2 TD
- Georgia – None

Receiving

- New Orleans – Skyler Green: 11 rec, 150 yards, 2 TD
- Georgia – Maurice Purify: 11 rec, 106 yards, 4 TD

=== Week 16: vs. Spokane Shock ===
Week 16: Spokane Shock at New Orleans VooDoo – Game summary

Quarter	1	2	3	4	Total
Shock	21	20	14	20	75
VooDoo	7	7	7	33	54

at New Orleans Arena, New Orleans, Louisiana

- Date: June 25
- Game time: 7:00 p.m. CDT
- Game attendance: 9,037
- Referee: Scott Vaughn
- Recap

Game information

1st quarter

- Spokane – (14:47) Terrance Sanders 57-yard kickoff return (Taylor Rowan kick), Spokane 7–0
- New Orleans – (10:05) Carlese Franklin 19-yard pass from D. Bryant (Jonathan Ruffin kick), Tied 7–7
- Spokane – (6:52) Shaun Kauleinamoku 11-yard pass from Kyle Rowley (Taylor Rowan kick), Spokane 14–7
- Spokane – (4:46) Antwan Marsh 12-yard fumble recovery (Taylor Rowan kick), Spokane 21–7

2nd quarter

- Spokane – (14:54) Kyle Rowley 1-yard run (Taylor Rowan kick blocked), Spokane 27–7
- New Orleans – (13:53) P.J. Berry 54-yard kickoff return (Jonathan Ruffin kick), Spokane 27–14
- Spokane – (8:20) Chas Gessner 20-yard pass from Kyle Rowley (Taylor Rowan kick), Spokane 34–14
- Spokane – (0:06) Chas Gessner 34-yard pass from Kyle Rowley (Taylor Rowan kick), Spokane 41–14

3rd quarter

- Spokane – (7:18) Greg Orton 28-yard pass from Kyle Rowley (Taylor Rowan kick), Spokane 48–14
- New Orleans – (5:52) Skyler Green 7-yard pass from D. Bryant (Jonathan Ruffin kick), Spokane 48–21
- Spokane – (0:15) Clay Harrell 1-yard run (Taylor Rowan kick), Spokane 55–21

4th quarter

- New Orleans – (11:00) P.J. Berry 16-yard pass from D. Bryant (Jonathan Ruffin kick), Spokane 55–28
- New Orleans – (10:07) P.J. Berry 30-yard pass from D. Bryant (Jonathan Ruffin failed), Spokane 55–34
- Spokane – (7:41) Shaun Kauleinamoku 8-yard pass from Bill Stull (Taylor Rowan kick), Spokane 62–34
- New Orleans – (6:04) Skyler Green 21-yard pass from D. Bryant (D. Bryant pass intercepted), Spokane 62–40
- Spokane – (2:41) Adron Tennell 21-yard pass from Bill Stull (Taylor Rowan kick), Spokane 69–40
- New Orleans – (1:03) P.J. Berry 11-yard pass from D. Bryant (D. Bryant pass), Spokane 69–48
- Spokane – (0:34) Bill Stull 1-yard run (Taylor Rowan kick failed), Spokane 75–48
- New Orleans – (0:07) Tom Taggert 2-yard run (D. Bryant pass failed), Spokane 75–54

Passing

- Spokane – Kyle Rowley: 16/27, 123 yards, 4 TD
- New Orleans – D. Bryant: 24/41, 271 yards, 6 TD

Rushing

- Spokane – Clay Harrell and Bill Stull: 1 att, 1 yard, 1 TD
- New Orleans – Tom Taggert: 2 att, 6 yards, 1 TD

Receiving

- Spokane – Chas Gessner: 7 rec, 96 yards, 2 TD
- New Orleans – P.J. Berry: 7 rec, 95 yards, 3 TD

=== Week 17: at Tampa Bay Storm ===
Week 17: New Orleans VooDoo at Tampa Bay Storm – Game summary

Quarter	1	2	3	4	Total
VooDoo	10	21	7	26	64
Storm	13	12	0	8	33

at St. Pete Times Forum, Tampa, Florida

- Date: July 1
- Game time: 6:30 p.m. CDT
- Game attendance: 12,016
- Referee: Tom Cannella
- Recap

Game information

1st quarter

- New Orleans – (13:16) Skyler Green 23-yard pass from D. Bryant (Jonathan Ruffin kick), New Orleans 7–0
- Tampa Bay – (11:33) Hank Edwards 25-yard pass from Brian Zbydniewski (Kyle Chilton kick failed), New Orleans 7–6
- New Orleans – (4:57) Jonathan Ruffin 29-yard field goal, New Orleans 10–6
- Tampa Bay – (0:51) Huey Whittaker 18-yard pass from Brian Zbydniewski (Kyle Chilton kick), Tampa Bay 13–10

2nd quarter

- New Orleans – (8:12) L.J. Castile 5-yard pass from D. Bryant (Jonathan Ruffin kick), New Orleans 17–13
- Tampa Bay – (6:27) Amarri Jackson 34-yard pass from Brian Zbydniewski (Kyle Chilton kick failed), Tampa Bay 19–17
- New Orleans – (1:22) Carlese Franklin 15-yard pass from D. Bryant (Jonathan Ruffin kick), New Orleans 24–19
- Tampa Bay – (0:34) Amarri Jackson 2-yard pass from Brian Zbydniewski (Kyle Chilton kick failed), Tampa Bay 25–24
- New Orleans – (0:00) Danny Wimprine 3-yard run (Jonathan Ruffin kick), New Orleans 31–25

3rd quarter

- New Orleans – (11:23) P.J. Berry 2-yard pass from D. Bryant (Jonathan Ruffin kick), New Orleans 38–25

4th quarter

- New Orleans – (14:56) P.J. Berry 1-yard run (Danny Wimprine rush failed), New Orleans 44–25
- New Orleans – (10:26) Carlese Franklin 20-yard pass from D. Bryant (Jonathan Ruffin kick failed), New Orleans 50–25
- New Orleans – (8:53) Alvin Jackson 20-yard interception return (Jonathan Ruffin kick), New Orleans 57–25
- Tampa Bay – (6:20) Hank Edwards 25-yard pass from Danny Southwick (Danny Southwick pass), New Orleans 57–33
- New Orleans – (2:14) D. Bryant 1-yard run (Jonathan Ruffin kick), New Orleans 64–33

Passing

- New Orleans – D. Bryant: 24/43, 215 yards, 5 TD
- Tampa Bay – Brian Zbydniewski: 17/26, 189 yards, 4 TD, 3 INT

Rushing

- New Orleans – Tom Taggert: 5 att, 20 yards
- Tampa Bay – Terrance Royal: 1 att, 2 yards

Receiving

- New Orleans – Carlese Franklin: 6 rec, 71 yards, 2 TD
- Tampa Bay – Amarri Jackson: 11 rec, 123 yards, 2 TD

=== Week 18: vs. Milwaukee Mustangs ===
Week 18: Milwaukee Mustangs at New Orleans VooDoo – Game summary

Quarter	1	2	3	4	Total
Mustangs	21	21	13	21	76
VooDoo	14	13	7	21	55

at New Orleans Arena, New Orleans, Louisiana

- Date: July 8
- Game time: 7:00 p.m. CDT
- Game attendance: 9,359
- Referee: Chris Snead
- Recap

Game information

1st quarter

- New Orleans – (10:16) Skyler Green 14-yard pass from D. Bryant (Jonathan Ruffin kick), New Orleans 7–0
- Milwaukee – (8:31) Victor Williams 26-yard pass from Gino Guidugli (Garrett Lindholm kick), Tied 7–7
- New Orleans – (4:29) P.J. Berry 3-yard run (Jonathan Ruffin kick), New Orleans 14–7
- Milwaukee – (2:36) Dwayne Eley Jr. 19-yard pass from Gino Guidugli (Garrett Lindholm kick), Tied 14–14
- Milwaukee – (1:02) Justin Lawrence 5-yard run (Garrett Lindholm kick), Milwaukee 21–14

2nd quarter

- New Orleans – (14:52) D. Bryant 1-yard run (Jonathan Ruffin rush fumbled), Milwaukee 21–20
- Milwaukee – (9:53) Victor Williams 10-yard pass from Gino Guidugli (Garrett Lindholm kick), Milwaukee 28–20
- New Orleans – (6:20) P.J. Berry 6-yard pass from D. Bryant (Jonathan Ruffin kick), Milwaukee 28–27
- Milwaukee – (1:15) Justin Lawrence 2-yard run (Garrett Lindholm kick), Milwaukee 35–27
- Milwaukee – (0:22) Justin Lawrence 3-yard fumble recovery (Garrett Lindholm kick), Milwaukee 42–27

3rd quarter

- Milwaukee – (9:11) Justin Lawrence 3-yard run (Garrett Lindholm kick failed), Milwaukee 48–27
- Milwaukee – (3:35) Brandon Brinkley 46-yard interception return (Garrett Lindholm kick), Milwaukee 55–27
- New Orleans – (0:28) Skyler Green 17-yard pass from Danny Wimprine (Jonathan Ruffin kick), Milwaukee 55–34

4th quarter

- Milwaukee – (11:37) Justin Lawrence 1-yard run (Garrett Lindholm kick), Milwaukee 62–34
- New Orleans – (10:34) Carlese Franklin 30-yard pass from Danny Wimprine (Jonathan Ruffin kick), Milwaukee 62–41
- Milwaukee – (9:57) Eddie Davis 8-yard kickoff return (Garrett Lindholm kick), Milwaukee 69–41
- New Orleans – (6:28) Tom Taggert 1-yard run (Jonathan Ruffin kick), Milwaukee 69–48
- Milwaukee – (2:04) Victor Williams 35-yard pass from Gino Guidugli (Garrett Lindholm kick), Milwaukee 76–48
- New Orleans – (0:13) L.J. Castile 3-yard pass from Danny Wimprine (Jonathan Ruffin kick), Milwaukee 76–55

Passing

- Milwaukee – Gino Guidugli: 21/31, 283 yards, 4 TD
- New Orleans – D. Bryant: 16/24, 179 yards, 2 TD, 1 INT

Rushing

- Milwaukee – Justin Lawrence: 5 att, 12 yards, 4 TD
- New Orleans – P.J. Berry: 3 att, 12 yards, 1 TD

Receiving

- Milwaukee – Victor Williams: 7 rec, 115 yards, 3 TD
- New Orleans – Skyler Green: 9 rec, 110 yards, 2 TD

=== Week 19: at Utah Blaze ===
Week 19: New Orleans VooDoo at Utah Blaze – Game summary

Quarter	1	2	3	4	Total
VooDoo	14	24	17	3	58
Blaze	14	13	14	21	62

at EnergySolutions Arena, Salt Lake City, Utah

- Date: July 16
- Game time: 4:00 p.m. CDT
- Game attendance: 10,631
- Referee: Dave Cutaia
- Recap

Game information

1st quarter

- Utah – (13:00) Michael Preston 7-yard pass from Todd Hammel (Kyle Brotzman kick), Utah 7–0
- New Orleans – (8:35) P.J. Berry 15-yard pass from Danny Wimprine (Jonathan Ruffin kick), Tied 7–7
- Utah – (2:36) Ben Stallings 5-yard run (Kyle Brotzman kick), Utah 14–7
- New Orleans – (1:36) Carlese Franklin 9-yard pass from Danny Wimprine (Jonathan Ruffin kick), Tied 14–14

2nd quarter

- New Orleans – (11:49) Jonathan Ruffin 41-yard field goal, New Orleans 17–14
- Utah – (10:58) Aaron Lesue 12-yard pass from Todd Hammel (Kyle Brotzman kick), Utah 21–17
- New Orleans – (8:40) Skyler Green 11-yard pass from Danny Wimprine (Jonathan Ruffin kick), New Orleans 24–21
- New Orleans – (5:04) Carlese Franklin 28-yard pass from Danny Wimprine (Jonathan Ruffin kick), New Orleans 31–21
- Utah – (2:06) Ben Stallings 1-yard run (Kyle Brotzman kick failed), New Orleans 31–27
- New Orleans – (0:49) P.J. Berry 22-yard pass from Danny Wimprine (Jonathan Ruffin kick), New Orleans 38–27

3rd quarter

- New Orleans – (11:47) Skyler Green 2-yard pass from Danny Wimprine (Jonathan Ruffin kick), New Orleans 45–27
- Utah – (9:23) Michael Preston 19-yard pass from Todd Hammel (Kyle Brotzman kick), New Orleans 45–34
- New Orleans – (5:17) Jonathan Ruffin 44-yard field goal, New Orleans 48–34
- Utah – (5:06) Chris Bocage 55-yard kickoff return (Kyle Brotzman kick), New Orleans 48–41
- New Orleans – (0:55) Skyler Green 11-yard pass from Danny Wimprine (Jonathan Ruffin kick), New Orleans 55–41

4th quarter

- Utah – (11:20) Michael Preston 17-yard pass from Todd Hammel (Kyle Brotzman kick), New Orleans 55–48
- Utah – (3:45) Chris Bocage 2-yard run (Kyle Brotzman kick), Tied 55–55
- New Orleans – (0:35) Jonathan Ruffin 34-yard field goal, New Orleans 58–55
- Utah – (0:09) Chris Bocage 5-yard pass from Todd Hammel (Kyle Brotzman kick), Utah 62–58

Passing

- New Orleans – Chris Wallace: 19/34, 265 yards, 7 TD, 1 INT
- Utah – Tommy Grady: 26/39, 316 yards, 5 TD, 1 INT

Rushing

- New Orleans – P.J. Berry: 2 att, 4 yards
- Utah – Ben Stallings: 5 att, 13 yards, 2 TD

Receiving

- New Orleans – P.J. Berry: 7 rec, 101 yards, 2 TD
- Utah – Aaron Lesue: 10 rec, 116 yards, 1 TD

=== Week 20: at Orlando Predators ===
Week 20: New Orleans VooDoo at Orlando Predators – Game summary

Quarter	1	2	3	4	Total
VooDoo	6	12	6	20	44
Predators	7	28	13	14	62

at Amway Center, Orlando, Florida

- Date: July 23
- Game time: 6:30 p.m. CDT
- Game attendance: 14,982
- Referee: Scott Vaughn
- Recap

Game information

1st quarter

- New Orleans – (6:45) Tom Taggart 6-yard run (Chris Maraviglia kick failed), New Orleans 6–0
- Orlando – (1:27) Bobby Sippio 10-yard pass from Nick Hill (Mark Lewis kick), Orlando 7–6

2nd quarter

- New Orleans – (14:57) P.J. Berry 9-yard pass from Danny Wimprine (Chris Maraviglia kick failed), New Orleans 12–7
- Orlando – (12:28) Bobby Sippio 13-yard pass from Nick Hill (Mark Lewis kick), Orlando 14–12
- Orlando – (6:07) Marlon Moye-Moore 1-yard run (Mark Lewis kick), Orlando 21–12
- New Orleans – (4:23) P.J. Berry 23-yard pass from Danny Wimprine (Danny Wimprine pass failed), Orlando 21–18
- Orlando – (1:15) T.T. Toliver 3-yard pass from Nick Hill (Mark Lewis kick), Orlando 28–18
- Orlando – (0:04) Bobby Sippio 3-yard pass from Nick Hill (Mark Lewis kick), Orlando 35–18

3rd quarter

- Orlando – (12:53) Bobby Sippio 5-yard pass from Nick Hill (Mark Lewis kick), Orlando 42–18
- New Orleans – (7:17) Danny Wimprine 1-yard run (Danny Wimprine pass failed), Orlando 42–24
- Orlando – (5:27) Robert Quiroga 33-yard pass from Nick Hill (Mark Lewis kick failed), Orlando 48–24

4th quarter

- New Orleans – (13:52) Carlese Franklin 0-yard fumble recovery (Danny Wimprine pass), Orlando 48–32
- Orlando – (12:37) Robert Quiroga 8-yard pass from Nick Hill (Mark Lewis kick), Orlando 55–32
- New Orleans – (7:41) Alvin Jackson 27-yard interception return (Danny Wimprine pass failed), Orlando 55–38
- New Orleans – (0:55) P.J. Berry 12-yard run (Danny Wimprine pass failed), Orlando 55–44
- Orlando – (0:41) T.T. Toliver 3-yard run (Mark Lewis kick), Orlando 62–44

Passing

- New Orleans – Danny Wimprine: 13/31, 159 yards, 2 TD, 3 INT
- Orlando – Nick Hill: 24/32, 296 yards, 7 TD, 1 INT

Rushing

- New Orleans – Tom Taggart: 7 att, 40 yards, 1 TD
- Orlando – Nick Hill: 4 att, 38 yards

Receiving

- New Orleans – P.J. Berry: 6 rec, 79 yards, 2 TD
- Orlando – Bobby Sippio: 14 rec, 166 yards, 4 TD
