= Eagle Lake, Florida =

- City
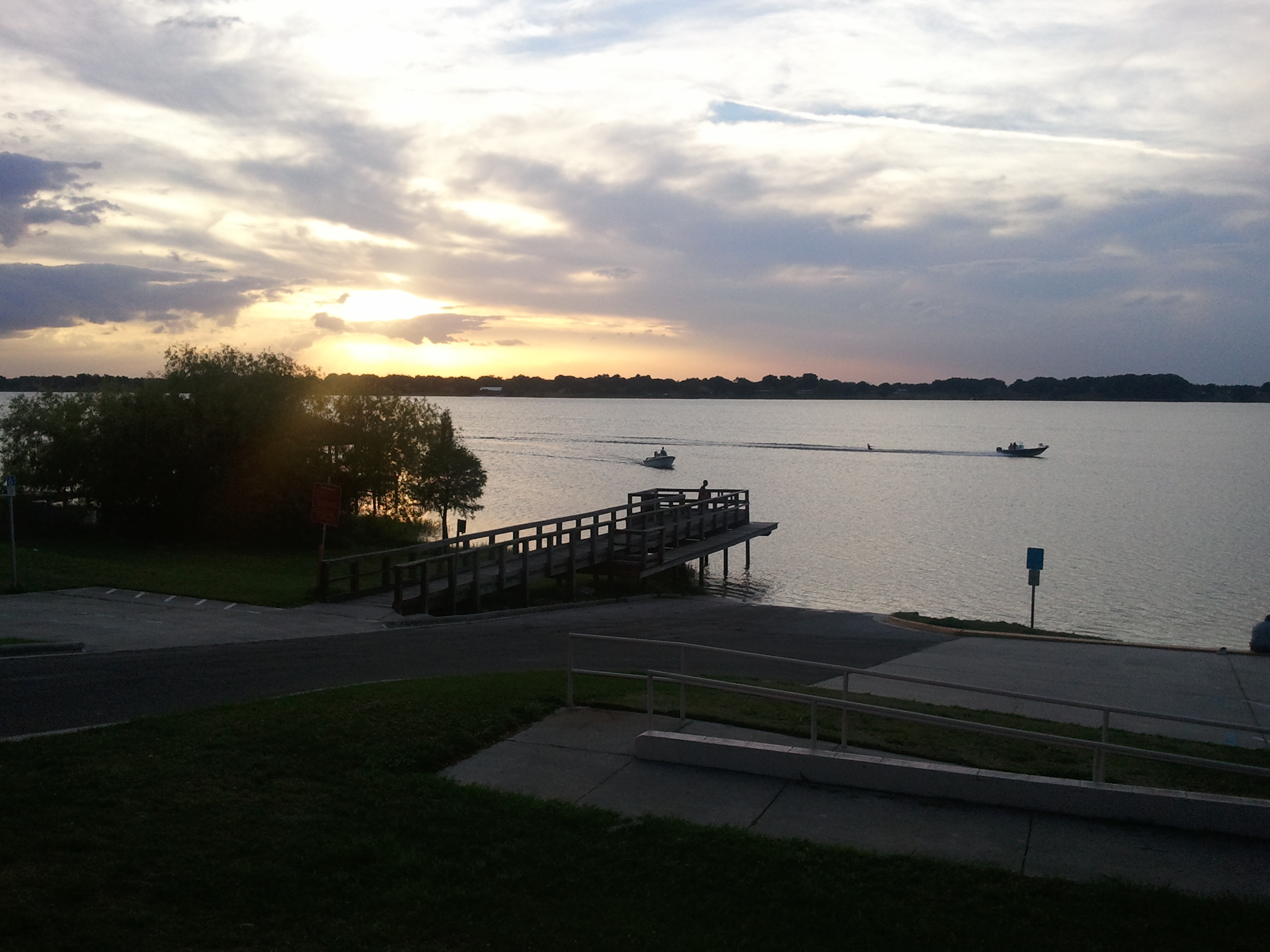
- A dock overlooking Eagle Lake at sunset.

- Seal
- Motto: "Growing with People in Mind"
- Location in Polk County and the state of Florida
- Coordinates: 27°58′20″N 81°45′17″W
- Country: United States
- State: Florida
- County: Polk
- Settled: 1880
- Platted: 1887
- Incorporated (town): October 1921
- Incorporated (city): November 1975

Government
  - Type: Commission–Manager
  - Mayor: Cory Coler
  - Vice Mayor: Steven Metosh
  - Commissioners: Randy Billings, Steve Williams, and Pamela Chaney
  - City Manager: Thomas Ernharth
  - City Clerk: Dawn Wright

Area
  - Total: 4.21 sq mi (10.90 km^{2})
  - Land: 2.38 sq mi (6.17 km^{2})
  - Water: 1.83 sq mi (4.73 km^{2})
- Elevation: 157 ft (48 m)

Population (2020)
  - Total: 3,008
  - Density: 1,262.4/sq mi (487.43/km^{2})
- Time zone: UTC-5 (Eastern (EST))
  - Summer (DST): UTC-4 (EDT)
- ZIP code: 33839
- Area code: 863
- FIPS code: 12-18875
- GNIS feature ID: 2403526
- Website: www.eaglelakefl.gov

Eagle Lake is a city in Polk County, Florida, United States. It is part of the Lakeland–Winter Haven Metropolitan Statistical Area. Most of the town being centered around a subsection of U.S. Highway 17. The population was 3,008 as of 2020.

== History ==
In 1880, Eagle Lake was first settled when John Bingham purchased 160 acres on a knoll between the areas now known as Eagle Lake, Lake McLeod, and Spirit Lake. He named the lake and community "Eagle Lake", because he saw an eagle that was nesting in a nearby pine tree by the lake, from the viewpoint of the log cabin he built. When he sold his land in 1887, it was platted as a community that same year.

On October 1921, the "Town of Eagle Lake" was officially incorporated as a municipality, and was later reincorporated as the City of Eagle Lake on November 1975.

Earlier on, Eagle Lake was known for its local businesses. These included a brickyard, a turpentine mill, and two citrus packing houses that were both lost in the 1940s. During the mid 1950s and into the 1960s, the city was host to a wooden bathing house with dressing rooms, a long, wooden covered dock, a dance hall, a picnic facilities, and a diving platform at the Crystal Beach Pavilion on the southwest side of Eagle Lake. During the 1980s, the city adopted the motto "Growing with People in Mind". It continues to be the tenet of the city today.

== Geography ==
Eagle Lake is located within the Central Florida Highlands area of the Atlantic coastal plain, with a terrain consisting of flatland interspersed with gently rolling hills.

According to the United States Census Bureau, the city has a total area of 1.4 square miles (3.6 km^{2}), of which 1.4 square miles (3.6 km^{2}) is land and 0.1 square miles (0.26 km^{2}) (3.50%) is water.

=== Climate ===
Eagle Lake is located in the humid subtropical climate zone, as designated by (Köppen climate classification: Cfa).

== Demographics ==
Historical population
Census	Pop.	Note	%±
1930	600		—
1940	862		43.7%
1950	1,060		23.0%
1960	1,364		28.7%
1970	1,373		0.7%
1980	1,678		22.2%
1990	1,758		4.8%
2000	2,496		42.0%
2010	2,255		−9.7%
2020	3,008		33.4%
U.S. Decennial Census

=== Racial and ethnic composition ===
Eagle Lake racial composition (Hispanics excluded from racial categories) (NH = Non-Hispanic)
Race	Pop 2010	Pop 2020	% 2010	% 2020
White (NH)	1,628	1,663	72.20%	55.29%
Black or African American (NH)	157	424	6.96%	14.10%
Native American or Alaska Native (NH)	10	7	0.44%	0.23%
Asian (NH)	49	51	2.17%	1.70%
Pacific Islander or Native Hawaiian (NH)	0	1	0.00%	0.03%
Some other race (NH)	10	28	0.44%	0.93%
Two or more races/Multiracial (NH)	38	116	1.69%	3.86%
Hispanic or Latino (any race)	363	718	16.10%	23.87%
Total	2,255	3,008		

=== 2020 census ===
As of the 2020 census, Eagle Lake had a population of 3,008. The median age was 33.5 years. 28.3% of residents were under the age of 18 and 12.1% of residents were 65 years of age or older. For every 100 females there were 93.4 males, and for every 100 females age 18 and over there were 90.1 males age 18 and over.

As of 2020, 100.0% of residents lived in urban areas, while 0.0% lived in rural areas.

In 2020, there were 1,002 households in Eagle Lake, of which 42.1% had children under the age of 18 living in them. Of all households, 48.2% were married-couple households, 13.8% were households with a male householder and no spouse or partner present, and 27.0% were households with a female householder and no spouse or partner present. About 17.5% of all households were made up of individuals and 7.6% had someone living alone who was 65 years of age or older.

In 2020, there were 1,084 housing units, of which 7.6% were vacant. The homeowner vacancy rate was 2.4% and the rental vacancy rate was 10.8%.

As of the 2020 census, there were 573 families residing in the city.

=== 2010 census ===
As of the 2010 United States census, there were 2,255 people, 641 households, and 462 families residing in the city.

=== 2000 census ===
As of the census of 2000, there were 2,496 people, 879 households, and 637 families residing in the city. The population density was 1,800.5 inhabitants per square mile (695.2/km^{2}). There were 964 housing units at an average density of 695.4 per square mile (268.5/km^{2}). The racial makeup of the city was 82.09% White, 4.73% African American, 0.68% Native American, 0.24% Asian, 9.86% from other races, and 2.40% from two or more races. Hispanic or Latino of any race were 21.47% of the population.

In 2000, there were 879 households, out of which 34.8% had children under the age of 18 living with them, 48.9% were married couples living together, 17.4% had a female householder with no husband present, and 27.5% were non-families. 20.3% of all households were made up of individuals, and 8.8% had someone living alone who was 65 years of age or older. The average household size was 2.81 and the average family size was 3.21.

In 2000, in the city, the population was spread out, with 29.4% under the age of 18, 9.5% from 18 to 24, 28.3% from 25 to 44, 20.9% from 45 to 64, and 11.9% who were 65 years of age or older. The median age was 33 years. For every 100 females, there were 96.1 males. For every 100 females age 18 and over, there were 93.4 males.

In 2000, the median income for a household in the city was $31,250, and the median income for a family was $35,078. Males had a median income of $27,500 versus $19,417 for females. The per capita income for the city was $13,249. About 14.6% of families and 17.9% of the population were below the poverty line, including 18.9% of those under age 18 and 12.9% of those age 65 or over.

== Government and politics ==
The City of Eagle Lake has a commission-manager form of government. The city commission consists of five commissioners, each elected for a two-year term. The mayor and vice-mayor are sitting commissioners whom are elected annually by the commissioners. The city's executive powers rest with the city manager, as contracted by the city commission. The budget for the 2023-24 fiscal year is $2.4 million. Water and sewer services are provided by the City of Eagle Lake to residents within the incorporated city limits and nearby areas. Eagle Lake is encompassed by the Southwest Florida Water Management District which regulates and permits the use of water in the region. The city of Eagle Lake also operates the Eagle Lake Public library, which is part of the Polk County Library Cooperative.

=== Law enforcement ===
After signing a contract with the Polk County Sheriff's office in 2007, the City of Eagle Lake began contracting law enforcement services from the Polk County Sheriff's Office.

=== Fire services ===
Fire services for the city are contracted with the Polk County Board of County Commissioners. Eagle Lake is home to Polk County Fire Rescue Station 460 (Rescue 46).

== Library ==
The Eagle Lake Public Library is a member of the Polk County Library Cooperative. The library is located at 75 North Seventh Street Eagle Lake, Florida 33839. It is a part of the city hall complex.

== Transportation ==
The main highway going through town is U.S. 17. At the southern end of town, the highway divides into two three-three lane one way segments, with the northbound section on 5th Street and the southbound segment on 4th Street. On the north side of town, the two segments converge to become. a six-lane divided highway. US 17 leads northward to Winter Haven and southward to Bartow. Eagle Lake also intersects with County Road 540. This thoroughfare provides access to State Road 570 and U.S. 98 for travel to nearby Lakeland, and major metropolitan cities Tampa and Orlando.

Eagle Lake is also located close to Bartow Municipal Airport. This location provides a travel hub for private flights in and out of the Central Florida area.

== Education ==
=== Public schools ===
Public schools in Eagle Lake (and all of Polk County) are operated by Polk County Public Schools.

- Eagle Lake Elementary
- Pinewood Elementary
- Lake Region High School
- Wahneta Elementary School

=== Colleges and universities ===
- Polk State College has campuses located in Lakeland, Winter Haven, and Lake Wales.
- Florida Polytechnic University is located within about 15 minutes of the city.
- Florida Southern College and Southeastern University are located in Lakeland.
- Warner University is located in Lake Wales.
- Webber International University is located in Babson Park.

== Recreation and leisure ==
The city has a baseball / softball complex that has three 200' fields and one 275' field. Additionally, the City Hall complex hosts basketball, racquetball and shuffleboard courts, as well as a skate park and playground for children.

There are also two boat ramps available for access to Lake McLeod and Eagle Lake. At the Eagle Lake ramp, there is also a municipal park that has a pavilion, playground, beach, and restroom facilities.

== Notable people ==
- Henry Delp Styer, US Army brigadier general
