= Milwaukee Mustangs =

Milwaukee Mustangs refers to:

- Milwaukee Mustangs (1994–2001), a professional arena football team formerly in the Arena Football League
- Milwaukee Mustangs (2009–12), a professional arena football team formerly in the af2 and Arena Football League
