= List of Milwaukee Mustangs seasons =

List of Milwaukee Mustangs seasons may refer to:

- List of Milwaukee Mustangs (1994–2001) seasons
- List of Milwaukee Mustangs (2009–12) seasons
