= Bob Landsee =

American football player and coach (1964–2024)

No. 65
- Positions: Center, guard

Personal information
- Born: March 21, 1964; Iron Mountain, Michigan, U.S.
- Died: January 20, 2024 (aged 59); Naples, Florida, U.S.
- Listed height: 6 ft 4 in (1.93 m)
- Listed weight: 273 lb (124 kg)

Career information
- High school: Iron Mountain
- College: Wisconsin
- NFL draft: 1986: 6th round, 149th overall pick

Career history

Playing
- Philadelphia Eagles (1986–1987)

Coaching
- Milwaukee Mustangs (1999–2001) Offensive line coach; Toronto Phantoms (2002); Indiana Firebirds (2003); Green Bay Blizzard (2005–2006) Head coach; Green Bay Blizzard (2008–2009) Head coach; Milwaukee Iron/Mustangs (2010–2012) Head coach; Jacksonville Sharks (2016) Interim head coach

Awards and highlights
- First-team All-Big Ten (1985)

Career NFL statistics
- Games played: 9
- Games started: 2
- Stats at Pro Football Reference

Robert John Landsee (March 21, 1964 – January 20, 2024) was an American professional football player and coach. He played college football for the Wisconsin Badgers and was selected in the sixth round of the 1986 NFL draft by the Philadelphia Eagles, where he played as a center and guard for parts of three seasons. He later served as head coach and owner of the Milwaukee Mustangs of the Arena Football League (AFL).

== Playing career ==
Landsee earned All-State honors in both football and basketball at Iron Mountain High School.

At Wisconsin playing for coach Dave McClain from 1982 to 1985, he earned All-American and All-Big Ten honors. Landsee helped lead the 1984 Badgers team to the Hall of Fame Bowl, and 16 players from that team went onto play in the NFL, including three first-round draft picks: Al Toon, Richard Johnson, and Darryl Sims.

Landsee was drafted by the Philadelphia Eagles in the sixth round of the 1986 NFL draft. He started 33 games in three seasons with the Eagles, from 1986 to 1988. In a 1986 game, he had the distinction of snapping the ball to three different quarterbacks on the same series: Ron Jaworski, Matt Cavanaugh, and Randall Cunningham, and in 1988 he played in the legendary Fog Bowl against the Chicago Bears. The Eagles declined to offer him a contract to return to the team in the 1989 season.

His career was plagued with injuries. He blew out his knee in 1984 in the sixth Badgers game of the season against first-place Illinois. And he broke his leg in his first practice as a member of the Eagles and appeared in only nine games in his NFL career.

He was inducted into the Upper Peninsula Sports Hall of Fame in 1996.

== Coaching career ==
Landsee's many coaching stops included a stint at Madison West High School in Madison, Wisconsin.

=== Milwaukee Mustangs ===
Landsee was the offensive line coach for the Milwaukee Mustangs of the Arena Football League (AFL) from 1999–2001.

=== Toronto Phantoms and Indiana Firebirds ===
Landsee was a coach for the Toronto Phantoms in 2002 and for the Indiana Firebirds in 2003.

=== Green Bay Blizzard ===
Landsee was the head coach for the Green Bay Blizzard of the AF2 from 2005–2006 and from 2008–2009. He finished his career with the Blizzard with a record of 45–28 including playoffs. In 2006, Landsee coached the Blizzard to an East Division and American Conference Championship. He also brought his team to ArenaCup VII where they lost to the Spokane Shock 57–34. In 2008, the Blizzard had their best regular season record in franchise history, going 11–5 and earning the Midwest Division Championship. Under Landsee, 27 players signed contracts with fully professional teams, such as the AFL, the NFL or the Canadian Football League.

=== Milwaukee Iron ===
Landsee was named head coach of the Milwaukee Iron of the AFL on October 13, 2009.

=== Jacksonville Sharks ===
Landsee had been serving as the line coach of the Jacksonville Sharks of the AFL when he was named the interim head coach of the team after former head coach Les Moss was fired with two games to go in the 2016 season.

=== AFL head coaching record ===
Team	Year	Regular season				Postseason			
Team	Year	Won	Lost	Win %	Finish	Won	Lost	Win %	Result
MIL	2010	11	5	.688	1st in NC Midwest	1	1	.500	Lost to Spokane Shock in NC Championship
MIL	2011	7	11	.389	3rd in AC East	0	0	.000	–
MIL	2012	5	13	.278	3rd in AC East	0	0	.000	–
MIL total		23	29	1.000		1	1	.500	
JAX	2016	2	0	1.000	3rd in AC	1	1	.500	Lost to Philadelphia Soul in AC Championship
Total		25	29	.463		2	2	.500	

== Personal life and death ==
Landsee was born in West Allis, Wis., and grew up in Iron Mountain, Mich. He married Sharon Dollins, a former University of Wisconsin–Madison track star, on March 21, 1987, and they had two daughters: Sara and Melissa.

In 1991, he started an energy efficient lighting business based in Middleton, Wis., called Watt Savers Inc., in which he installed new lighting for 78 school systems across Wisconsin. He sold the business in 1992. Later, Landsee became the majority owner of 31 Taco Bell locations.

In 1993, he suffered a brain aneurysm.

Landsee served as president of the Madison, Wis., chapter of the National Football League Alumni. He died on January 20, 2024, at his home in Naples, Fla., at the age of 59.
