= Gary Compton =

American football player and coach (born 1968)

No. 2, 3, 4
- Position: Wide receiver

Personal information
- Born: May 9, 1968 (age 58); Irving, Texas, U.S.
- Listed height: 6 ft 2 in (1.88 m)
- Listed weight: 200 lb (91 kg)

Career information
- College: East Texas State
- NFL draft: 1991: undrafted

Career history

Playing
- Dallas Texans (1992–1993); Fort Worth Cavalry (1994); Milwaukee Mustangs (1995–2001); Indiana Firebirds (2002); Grand Rapids Rampage (2002); Tampa Bay Storm (2003); Philadelphia Soul (2004)

Coaching
- Bakersfield Blitz (2006–2007) Head coach; Milwaukee Iron (2009)

Awards and highlights
- ArenaBowl champion (2003); 3× First-team All-Arena (1992, 1999, 2001); 2× AFL All-Ironman Team (1999, 2001); "Build Ford Tough" Man of the Year (2001); AFL's Second Team 15th Anniversary Team (2001); #2 Retired by the Milwaukee Mustangs

Career AFL statistics
- Receptions: 750
- Receiving yards: 10,368
- Touchdowns: 176
- Tackles: 157
- Interceptions: 15
- Stats at ArenaFan.com

Gary Compton (born May 9, 1968) is an American former professional football wide receiver and linebacker in the Arena Football League (AFL) and briefly in the National Football League (NFL) and World League of American Football (WLAF). Compton played college football at East Texas State (East Texas A&M) from 1987 to 1990 where he was an All-Conference and All-American wide receiver as well as a Harlon Hill Award candidate. He is the all-time leading career receiver for the East Texas A&M Football program.

== Early life ==
Compton was born and raised in Irving, Texas. In an interview with ArenaFan.com, he described himself as a "Typical Texas kid. My parents dressed me up in Dallas Cowboys’ gear and enrolled me in youth football leagues as soon as I could walk. Since I was five-years-old, my parents had a football in my hands,” Compton said. “And the game has been a part of my life ever since.” Compton was a Football standout at Irving High School in Irving. His on the field successes earned him a Football scholarship to East Texas State University in Commerce, Texas.

== College career ==
Compton attended East Texas State University, where he was a standout wide receiver. A 4 year starter, he helped the Lions to an 8 win season and 2nd place finish in the Lone Star Conference in 1988 and in 1990 an LSC Conference Championship, and an appearance in the 1990 NCAA Division II playoffs finishing as national quarter-finalists with a 10-3 record. Compton graduated from ETSU in 1991 with a Bachelor's Degree in Marketing. Teaming up with future Arena League QB's Michael Trigg and Bobby Bounds, he helped the Lion offenses of the late 80's and 1990 to become some of the most potent in the country. He left Commerce as the All-Time leader in receiving, a four-time All-Lone Star Conference and two-time All-American selection. Compton holds school and conference records for receptions (181), yardage (3,041), and touchdowns (30) in a career.

== Professional career ==
Compton went undrafted in the 1991 NFL draft but signed with the San Francisco 49ers as an undrafted free agent. He was with the team throughout training camp, but was released by the team prior to the start of the season. He then joined the Montreal Machine of the World League of American Football for a short time before signing in the Arena Leagues, at first with the Cleveland Thunderbolts, and then was reunited with former Lion teammate Michael Trigg as he signed with the Dallas Texans. This began a long term career in the Arena Football League that saw Compton play for the Dallas Texans, Fort Worth Cavalry, Milwaukee Mustangs, Indiana Firebirds, Grand Rapids Rampage, Tampa Bay Storm, and Philadelphia Soul. Compton retired from football in 2004.

== Personal life ==
Compton is married and has 3 sons and 1 daughter and lives in Wisconsin. He has coached high school football in both Texas and Wisconsin and is currently the owner and operator of his own business.
