= Sean Riley (wide receiver, born 1974) =

American football player (born 1974)

No. 21
- Position: Offensive specialist

Personal information
- Born: August 17, 1974 (age 52)
- Listed height: 5 ft 9 in (1.75 m)
- Listed weight: 166 lb (75 kg)

Career information
- College: Western Michigan

Career history
- Milwaukee Mustangs (1999–2001); San Jose SaberCats (2001–2002)*; New York Giants (2002)*; Grand Rapids Rampage (2002–2003); Las Vegas Gladiators (2003); Orlando Predators (2004–2005)
- * Offseason or practice squad member only

Awards and highlights
- Second-team All-Arena (2000); AFL All-Ironman Team (2000)

Career AFL statistics
- Receptions: 257
- Receiving yards: 3,265
- Receiving TDs: 50
- Tackles: 76
- Interceptions: 2
- Stats at ArenaFan.com

Sean Riley (born August 17, 1974) is an American former professional football offensive specialist who played six seasons in the Arena Football League (AFL) with the Milwaukee Mustangs, Grand Rapids Rampage, Las Vegas Gladiators and Orlando Predators. He played college football at Western Michigan University.

== Early life ==
Sean Riley was born on August 17, 1974. He played college football for the Westeen Michigan Broncos of Western Michigan University. He returned 18 punts for 58 yards in 1995 while also returning two kicks for 35 yards. Riley caught 27 passes for 446 yards and three touchdowns in 1996.

== Professional career ==
Riley played for the Milwaukee Mustangs of the AFL from 1999 to 2001, earning Second-team All-Arena and AFL All-Ironman Team honors in 2000. He was selected by the San Jose SaberCats in the 2001 AFL Dispersal Draft. He was placed on the other league exempt list on January 21, 2002. Riley spent time with the New York Giants of the National Football League during the 2002 off-season. He was released before the start of the season. He was selected by the Grand Rapids Rampage in the 2002 AFL Expansion Draft. Riley was released by the Rampage on February 13, 2003. He signed with the AFL's Las Vegas Gladiators February 20, 2003. He was signed by the Orlando Predators of the AFL on March 3, 2004.
