= 2011 Milwaukee Mustangs season =

Arena Football League team season

- Head coach: Bob Landsee
- Home stadium: Bradley Center

Results
- Record: 7–11
- Division place: 3rd
- Playoffs: Did not qualify

The 2011 Milwaukee Mustangs season is the third season for the franchise, and the second in the Arena Football League (AFL). This is the first season for the team as the Mustangs, having previously been known as the Milwaukee Iron. The team is coached by Bob Landsee and plays their home games at Bradley Center. The Mustangs finished 7–11, missing the playoffs.

== Standings ==
East Division
Team	W	L	PCT	PF	PA	DIV	CON	Home	Away
y-Cleveland Gladiators	10	8	.556	904	842	4–2	6–5	7–2	3–6
Pittsburgh Power	9	9	.500	870	972	4–2	5–6	5–4	4–5
Milwaukee Mustangs	7	11	.389	872	867	1–5	3–8	4–5	3–6
Philadelphia Soul	6	12	.333	914	969	3–3	5–6	4–5	2–7

y - Clinched division

== Regular season schedule ==
The Mustangs began the season at home against the Chicago Rush on March 14, and concluded the season against the Rush in Chicago on July 23.

Week	Day	Date	Kickoff	Opponent	Results		Location	Report
Week	Day	Date	Kickoff	Opponent	Score	Record	Location	Report
1	Monday	March 14	6:30 p.m. CDT	Chicago Rush	L 41–49	0–1	Bradley Center	
2	Saturday	March 19	9:00 p.m. CDT	at Arizona Rattlers	L 31–62	0–2	US Airways Center	
3	Monday	March 28	6:30 p.m. CDT	Pittsburgh Power	L 47–49	0–3	Bradley Center	
4	Monday	April 4	6:30 p.m. CDT	Philadelphia Soul	W 51–49	1–3	Bradley Center	
5	Bye							
6	Friday	April 14	7:30 p.m. CDT	at Dallas Vigilantes	L 21–49	1–4	American Airlines Center	
7	Saturday	April 23	7:00 p.m. CDT	Georgia Force	L 48–57	1–5	Bradley Center	
8	Saturday	April 30	7:00 p.m. CDT	Tampa Bay Storm	W 50–33	2–5	Bradley Center	
9	Friday	May 6	6:30 p.m. CDT	at Cleveland Gladiators	L 41–50	2–6	Quicken Loans Arena	
10	Saturday	May 14	9:00 p.m. CDT	at Utah Blaze	W 65–53	3–6	EnergySolutions Arena	
11	Bye							
12	Saturday	May 26	7:00 p.m. CDT	Orlando Predators	L 30–35	3–7	Bradley Center	
13	Friday	June 3	6:00 p.m. CDT	at Philadelphia Soul	L 37–39	3–8	Wells Fargo Center	
14	Saturday	June 11	7:00 p.m. CDT	Kansas City Command	W 54–34	4–8	Bradley Center	
15	Saturday	June 18	6:00 p.m. CDT	at Jacksonville Sharks	L 47–62	4–9	Jacksonville Veterans Memorial Arena	
16	Saturday	June 25	6:30 p.m. CDT	at Pittsburgh Power	L 38–39	4–10	Consol Energy Center	
17	Saturday	July 2	7:00 p.m. CDT	Cleveland Gladiators	L 58–62	4–11	Bradley Center	
18	Friday	July 8	6:00 p.m. CDT	at New Orleans VooDoo	W 76–55	5–11	New Orleans Arena	
19	Friday	July 15	7:00 p.m. CDT	Iowa Barnstormers	W 83–49	6–11	Bradley Center	
20	Saturday	July 23	7:00 p.m. CDT	at Chicago Rush	W 54–41	7–11	Allstate Arena	

== Regular season ==
=== Week 1: vs. Chicago Rush ===
Week 1: Chicago Rush at Milwaukee Mustangs – Game summary

Quarter	1	2	3	4	Total
Rush	21	7	14	7	49
Mustangs	7	20	0	14	41

at Bradley Center, Milwaukee, Wisconsin

- Date: March 14
- Game time: 6:30 p.m. CDT
- Game attendance: 3,157
- Recap

Game information

1st quarter

- Milwaukee – (10:30) Damian Harrell 20-yard pass from Eric Ward (Garrett Lindholm kick), Milwaukee 7–0
- Chicago – (8:27) Reggie Gray 27-yard pass from Russ Michna (Chris Gould kick), Tied 7–7
- Chicago – (3:33) Charles Dillon 10-yard pass from Russ Michna (Chris Gould kick), Chicago 14–7
- Chicago – (1:32) Reggie Gray 7-yard pass from Russ Michna (Chris Gould kick), Chicago 21–7

2nd quarter

- Milwaukee – (13:45) Antoine Burns 44-yard pass from Eric Ward (Garrett Lindholm kick), Chicago 21–14
- Chicago – (9:50) Johnie Kirton 2-yard pass from Russ Michna (Chris Gould kick), Chicago 28–14
- Milwaukee – (5:31) Brent Holmes 6-yard pass from Eric Ward (Garrett Lindholm kick), Chicago 28–21
- Milwaukee – (0:36) Eric Ward 5-yard run (Garrett Lindholm kick failed), Chicago 28–27

3rd quarter

- Chicago – (13:30) Charles Dillon 13-yard pass from Russ Michna (Chris Gould kick), Chicago 35–27
- Chicago – (2:55) Reggie Gray 11-yard pass from Russ Michna (Chris Gould kick), Chicago 42–27

4th quarter

- Milwaukee – (14:53) Brent Holmes 42-yard pass from Eric Ward (Garrett Lindholm kick), Chicago 42–34
- Chicago – (9:20) Charles Dillon 23-yard pass from Russ Michna (Chris Gould kick), Chicago 49–34
- Milwaukee – (0:55) Antoine Burns 15-yard pass from Eric Ward (Garrett Lindholm kick), Chicago 49–41

Passing

- Chicago – Russ Michna: 19/26, 240 yards, 7 TD, 1 INT
- Milwaukee – Eric Ward: 25/44, 296 yards, 5 TD, 1 INT

Rushing

- Chicago – Marcus Waugh: 3 att, 16 yards
- Milwaukee – Eric Ward: 5 att, 16 yards, 1 TD

Receiving

- Chicago – Charles Dillon: 8 rec, 109 yards, 3 TD
- Milwaukee – Damian Harrell: 9 rec, 90 yards, 1 TD

=== Week 2: at Arizona Rattlers ===
Week 2: Milwaukee Mustangs at Arizona Rattlers – Game summary

Quarter	1	2	3	4	Total
Mustangs	7	10	7	7	31
Rattlers	7	17	14	24	62

at US Airways Center, Phoenix, Arizona

- Date: March 19
- Game time: 9:00 p.m. CDT
- Game attendance: 9,108
- Referee: David Cutaia

Game information

1st quarter

- Milwaukee – (6:05) Eric Ward 2-yard run (Garrett Lindholm kick), Milwaukee 7–0
- Arizona – (2:38) Jason Geathers 8-yard pass from Nick Davila (Joe Schroeder kick), Tied 7–7

2nd quarter

- Milwaukee – (12:53) Garrett Lindholm 21-yard field goal, Milwaukee 10–7
- Arizona – (8:37) Team safety, Milwaukee 10–9
- Arizona – (4:08) Nate Forse 18-yard pass from Nick Davila (Joe Schroeder kick), Arizona 16–10
- Milwaukee – (1:38) Eric Ward 1-yard run (Garrett Lindholm kick), Milwaukee 17–16
- Arizona – (0:00) Nate Forse 11-yard pass from Nick Davila (Trevor Harris rush), Arizona 24–17

3rd quarter

- Arizona – (12:26) Trandon Harvey 10-yard pass from Nick Davila (Joe Schroeder kick), Arizona 31–17
- Milwaukee – (6:38) Brent Holmes 5-yard pass from Eric Ward (Garrett Lindholm kick), Arizona 31–24
- Arizona – (4:16) Rod Windsor 35-yard pass from Nick Davila (Joe Schroeder kick), Arizona 38–24

4th quarter

- Arizona – (13:31) Joe Schroeder 35-yard field goal, Arizona 41–24
- Milwaukee – (10:16) Eric Ward 1-yard run (Garrett Lindholm kick), Arizona 41–31
- Arizona – (8:31) Rod Windsor 21-yard pass from Nick Davila (Joe Schroeder kick), Arizona 48–31
- Arizona – (3:46) Nate Forse 6-yard pass from Nick Davila (Joe Schroeder kick), Arizona 55–31
- Arizona – (0:49) Amtajj Hawthorne 2-yard fumble recovery (Joe Schroeder kick), Arizona 62–31

Passing

- Milwaukee – Eric Ward: 17/31, 181 yards, 1 TD, 2 INT
- Arizona – Nick Davila: 22/36, 286 yards, 6 TD, 1 TD

Rushing

- Milwaukee – Eric Ward: 4 att, 6 yards, 3 TD
- Arizona – Odie Armstrong: 2 att, 6 yards

Receiving

- Milwaukee – Damian Harrell: 5 rec, 79 yards
- Arizona – Rod Windsor: 4 rec, 101 yards, 2 TD

=== Week 3: vs. Pittsburgh Power ===
Week 3: Pittsburgh Power at Milwaukee Mustangs – Game summary

Quarter	1	2	3	4	Total
Power	21	14	14	0	49
Mustangs	7	13	13	14	47

at Bradley Center, Milwaukee, Wisconsin

- Date: March 28
- Game time: 6:30 p.m. CDT
- Game attendance: 3,283
- Recap

Game information

1st quarter

- Pittsburgh – (13:33) Jerome Mathis 12-yard pass from MCCABE, Kevin McCabe (Paul Edinger kick), Pittsburgh 7–0
- Pittsburgh – (12:06) Joshua Rue 3-yard run (Paul Edinger kick), Pittsburgh 14–0
- Pittsburgh – (7:09) Nick Zeck 21-yard pass from Kevin McCabe (Paul Edinger kick), Pittsburgh 21–0
- Milwaukee – (4:29) Dwayne Eley Jr. 21-yard pass from Eric Ward (Garrett Lindholm kick), Pittsburgh 21–7

2nd quarter

- Pittsburgh – (14:22) Eddie Thompson 3-yard run (Paul Edinger kick), Pittsburgh 28–7
- Milwaukee – (10:39) Eric Ward 17-yard run (Garrett Lindholm kick failed), Pittsburgh 28–13
- Milwaukee – (0:55) Antoine Burns 7-yard pass from Eric Ward (Garrett Lindholm kick), Pittsburgh 28–20
- Pittsburgh – Eddie Thompson 11-yard pass from Kevin McCabe (Paul Edinger kick), Pittsburgh 35–20

3rd quarter

- Milwaukee – (11:25) Damian Harrell 17-yard pass from R.J. Archer (Garrett Lindholm kick failed), Pittsburgh 35–26
- Pittsburgh – (8:20) Joshua Rue 4-yard run (Paul Edinger kick), Pittsburgh 42–26
- Pittsburgh – (4:17) Lonnell Dewalt 27-yard pass from Kevin McCabe (Paul Edinger kick), Pittsburgh 49–26
- Milwaukee – (0:14) Antoine Burns 16-yard pass from R.J. Archer (Garrett Lindholm kick), Pittsburgh 49–33

4th quarter

- Milwaukee – (8:06) Jason Onyebuagu 1-yard run (R.J. Archer pass), Pittsburgh 49–41
- Milwaukee – (0:50) Andre Jones 54-yard interception return (R.J. Archer rush failed), Pittsburgh 49–47

Passing

- Pittsburgh – Kevin McCabe: 16/29, 182 yards, 4 TD, 3 INT
- Milwaukee – R.J. Archer: 12/21, 113 yards, 2 TD, 1 INT

Rushing

- Pittsburgh – Joshua Rue: 6 att, 28 yards, 2 TD
- Milwaukee – Eric Ward: 3 att, 31 yards, 1 TD

Receiving

- Pittsburgh – Jerome Mathis: 3 rec, 63 yards, 1 TD
- Milwaukee – Antoine Burns: 9 rec, 83 yards, 2 TD

=== Week 4: vs. Philadelphia Soul ===
Week 4: Philadelphia Soul at Milwaukee Mustangs – Game summary

Quarter	1	2	3	4	Total
Soul	20	20	3	6	49
Mustangs	3	21	7	20	51

at Bradley Center, Milwaukee, Wisconsin

- Date: April 4
- Game time: 6:30 p.m. CDT
- Recap

Game information

1st quarter

- Philadelphia – (14:51) Brando Perkins 4-yard net recovery (James Paul kick), Philadelphia 7–0
- Philadelphia – (7:04) Alan Turner 11-yard pass from Justin Allgood (James Paul kick), Philadelphia 14–0
- Milwaukee – (4:05) Garrett Lindholm 20-yard field goal, Philadelphia 14–7
- Philadelphia – (2:56) Larry Brackins 22-yard pass from Justin Allgood (James Paul kick failed), Philadelphia 20–3

2nd quarter

- Milwaukee – (14:20) Ernest Smith 9-yard pass from R.J. Archer (Garrett Lindholm kick failed), Philadelphia 20–9
- Philadelphia – (11:09) Ryan Vena 1-yard run (James Paul kick), Philadelphia 27–9
- Philadelphia – (7:06) Larry Brackins 33-yard pass from Justin Allgood (James Paul kick), Philadelphia 34–9
- Milwaukee – (5:10) Ernest Smith 31-yard pass from R.J. Archer (Garrett Lindholm kick), Philadelphia 34–16
- Philadelphia – (1:19) Alan Turner 6-yard pass from Justin Allgood (James Paul kick failed), Philadelphia 40–16
- Milwaukee – (0:15) R.J. Archer 1-yard run (R.J. Archer pass), Philadelphia 40–24

3rd quarter

- Milwaukee – (7:47) Jason Onyebuagu 4-yard run (Garrett Lindholm kick), Philadelphia 40–31
- Philadelphia – (1:30) James Paul 25-yard field goal, Philadelphia 43–31

4th quarter

- Milwaukee – (14:25) R.J. Archer 1-yard run (Garrett Lindholm kick), Philadelphia 43–38
- Milwaukee – (3:45) Dwayne Eley Jr. 2-yard run (R.J. Archer pass failed), Milwaukee 44–43
- Philadelphia – (1:37) Jerome Hayes 47-yard fumble recovery (Justin Allgood pass failed), Philadelphia 49–44
- Milwaukee – (0:00) Dwayne Eley Jr. 2-yard pass from R.J. Archer (Garrett Lindholm kick), Milwaukee 51–49

Passing

- Philadelphia – Justin Allgood: 19/35, 287 yards, 4 TD, 2 INT
- Milwaukee – R.J. Archer: 26/41, 297 yards, 3 TD

Rushing

- Philadelphia – Ryan Vena: 1 att, 1 yard, 1 TD
- Milwaukee – R.J. Archer: 2 att, 2 yards, 2 TD

Receiving

- Philadelphia – Larry Brackins: 7 rec, 126 yards, 2 TD
- Milwaukee – Ernest Smith: 11 rec, 142 yards, 2 TD

=== Week 6: at Dallas Vigilantes ===
Week 6: Milwaukee Mustangs at Dallas Vigilantes – Game summary

Quarter	1	2	3	4	Total
Mustangs	6	9	0	6	21
Vigilantes	7	28	7	7	49

at American Airlines Center, Dallas, Texas

- Date: April 14
- Game time: 7:30 p.m. CDT
- Game attendance: 6,014
- Referee: Chris Snead

Game information

1st quarter

- Dallas – (7:16) Derrick Ross 4-yard run (Remy Hamilton kick), Dallas 7–0
- Milwaukee – (2:24) R.J. Archer 1-yard run (Garrett Lindholm kick failed), Dallas 7–6

2nd quarter

- Dallas – (12:45) Matt Fields 1-yard run (Remy Hamilton kick), Dallas 14–6
- Milwaukee – (6:00) Garrett Lindholm 28-yard field goal, Dallas 14–9
- Dallas – (5:03) DeAndrew Rubin 41-yard pass from Dan Raudabaugh (Remy Hamilton kick), Dallas 21–9
- Dallas – (0:53) Tony Washington 12-yard pass from Dan Raudabaugh (Remy Hamilton kick), Dallas 28–9
- Milwaukee – (0:44) Mykel Benson 7-yard run (R.J. Archer pass failed), Dallas 28–15
- Dallas – (0:07) Anthony Jones 20-yard pass from Dan Raudabaugh (Remy Hamilton kick), Dallas 35–15

3rd quarter

- Dallas – (2:03) Derrick Ross 1-yard run (Remy Hamilton kick), Dallas 42–15

4th quarter

- Milwaukee – (11:34) Mykel Benson 2-yard run (R.J. Archer pass failed), Dallas 42–21
- Dallas – (7:08) DeAndrew Rubin 9-yard pass from Dan Raudabaugh (Remy Hamilton kick), Dallas 49–21

Passing

- Milwaukee – R.J. Archer: 15/33, 152 yards, 3 INT
- Dallas – Dan Raudabaugh: 14/25, 225 yards, 4 TD, 1 INT

Rushing

- Milwaukee – Mykel Benson: 6 att, 18 yards, 2 TD
- Dallas – Derrick Ross: 12 att, 40 yards, 2 TD

Receiving

- Milwaukee – Ernest Smith: 7 rec, 72 yards
- Dallas – DeAndrew Rubin: 4 rec, 84 yards, 2 TD

=== Week 7: vs. Georgia Force ===
Week 7: Georgia Force at Milwaukee Mustangs – Game summary

Quarter	1	2	3	4	Total
Force	16	13	14	14	57
Mustangs	0	6	14	28	48

at Bradley Center, Milwaukee, Wisconsin

- Date: April 23
- Game time: 7:00 p.m. CDT
- Game attendance: 3,712
- Referee: Alex Kemp
- Recap

Game information

1st quarter

- Georgia – (9:45) Maurice Purify 28-yard pass from Brett Elliott (Carlos Martinez kick), Georgia 7–0
- Georgia – (6:10) Team safety, Georgia 9–0
- Georgia – (3:02) Maurice Purify 14-yard pass from Brett Elliott (Carlos Martinez kick), Georgia 16–0

2nd quarter

- Milwaukee – (10:23) Mike Aguayo 1-yard pass from R.J. Archer (Garrett Lindholm kick failed), Georgia 16–6
- Georgia – (6:23) Ben McDowell 1-yard run (Carlos Martinez kick), Georgia 23–6
- Georgia – (0:21) Maurice Purify 31-yard pass from Brett Elliott (Carlos Martinez kick failed), Georgia 29–6

3rd quarter

- Georgia – (12:20) Larry Shipp 5-yard pass from Brett Elliott (Carlos Martinez kick), Georgia 36–6
- Milwaukee – (7:39) Damian Harrell 14-yard pass from R.J. Archer (R.J. Archer pass), Georgia 36–14
- Milwaukee – (4:21) Brent Holmes 1-yard run (R.J. Archer pass failed), Georgia 36–20
- Georgia – (1:12) C.J. Johnson 9-yard pass from Brett Elliott (Carlos Martinez kick), Georgia 43–20

4th quarter

- Milwaukee – (13:39) Mykel Benson 22-yard pass from R.J. Archer (Mykel Benson rush failed), Georgia 43–26
- Milwaukee – (12:15) Andre Jones 47-yard interception return (R.J. Archer. pass failed), Georgia 43–32
- Georgia – (9:04) Mike Johnson 8-yard pass from Brett Elliott (Carlos Martinez kick), Georgia 50–32
- Milwaukee – (3:23) Damian Harrell 9-yard pass from R.J. Archer (Mykel Benson rush), Georgia 50–40
- Georgia – (0:56) Larry Shipp 7-yard pass from Brett Elliott (Carlos Martinez kick), Georgia 57–40
- Milwaukee – (0:06) Mykel Benson 8-yard pass from R.J. Archer (R.J. Archer pass), Georgia 57–48

Passing

- Georgia – Brett Elliott: 20/31, 246 yards, 7 TD, 1 INT
- Milwaukee – R.J. Archer: 26/45, 281 yards, 5 TD, 3 TD

Rushing

- Georgia – Ben McDowell: 1 att, 1 yard, 1 TD
- Milwaukee – Mykel Benson: 6 att, 20 yards

Receiving

- Georgia – Maurice Purify: 6 rec, 105 yards, 3 TD
- Milwaukee – Ernest Smith: 10 rec, 139 yards

=== Week 8: vs. Tampa Bay Storm ===
Week 8: Tampa Bay Storm at Milwaukee Mustangs – Game summary

Quarter	1	2	3	4	Total
Storm	14	0	13	6	33
Mustangs	7	23	10	10	50

at Bradley Center, Milwaukee, Wisconsin

- Date: April 30
- Game time: 7:00 p.m. CDT
- Game attendance: 4,012
- Recap

Game information

1st quarter

- Milwaukee – (11:28) Mykel Benson 1-yard run (Garrett Lindholm kick), Milwaukee 7–0
- Tampa Bay – (9:10) Hank Edwards 28-yard pass from Brian Zbydniewski (Kyle Chilton kick), Tied 7–7
- Tampa Bay – (5:39) Amari Jackson 21-yard pass from Brian Zbydniewski (Kyle Chilton kick), Tampa Bay 14–7

2nd quarter

- Milwaukee – (14:14) Garrett Lindholm 21-yard field goal, Tampa Bay 14–10
- Milwaukee – (13:19) Marcus Everett 4-yard interception return (Garrett Lindholm kick blocked), Milwaukee 16–14
- Milwaukee – (11:47) Kelvin Rogers 10-yard interception return (Garrett Lindholm kick), Milwaukee 23–14
- Milwaukee – (8:12) Justin Lawrence 3-yard run (Garrett Lindholm kick), Milwaukee 30–14

3rd quarter

- Milwaukee – (10:15) Damian Harrell 4-yard pass from R.J. Archer (Garrett Lindholm kick), Milwaukee 37–14
- Tampa Bay – (5:43) Huey Whittaker 4-yard pass from Brian Zbydniewski (Kyle Chilton kick failed), Milwaukee 37–20
- Milwaukee – (2:51) Garrett Lindholm 23-yard field goal, Milwaukee 40–20
- Tampa Bay – (2:14) Huey Whittaker 41-yard pass from Brian Zbydniewski (Kyle Chilton kick), Milwaukee 40–27

4th quarter

- Milwaukee – (14:29) R.J. Archer 1-yard run (Garrett Lindholm kick), Milwaukee 47–27
- Milwaukee – (5:00) Garrett Lindholm 18-yard field goal, Milwaukee 50–27
- Tampa Bay – (2:47) Terrence Royal 1-yard run (Brian Zbydniewski rush failed), Milwaukee 50–33

Passing

- Tampa Bay – Brian Zbydniewski: 17/29, 270 yards, 4 TD, 3 INT
- Milwaukee – R.J. Archer: 16/23, 150 yards, 1 TD

Rushing

- Tampa Bay – Terrence Royal: 3 att, 3 yards, 1 TD
- Milwaukee – Mykel Benson: 5 att, 10 yards, 1 TD

Receiving

- Tampa Bay – Huey Whittaker: 8 rec, 113 yards, 2 TD
- Milwaukee – Ernest Smith: 6 rec, 82 yards

=== Week 9: at Cleveland Gladiators ===
Week 9: Milwaukee Mustangs at Cleveland Gladiators – Game summary

Quarter	1	2	3	4	Total
Mustangs	7	13	7	14	41
Gladiators	20	3	7	20	50

at Quicken Loans Arena, Cleveland, Ohio

- Date: May 6
- Game time: 6:30 p.m. CDT
- Game attendance: 5,077
- Referee: Tom McCabe

Game information

1st quarter

- Cleveland – (13:16) Robert Redd 28-yard pass from Kurt Rocco (Matt Denny kick), Cleveland 7–0
- Cleveland – (5:39) Carlos Downey 8-yard run (Matt Denny kick), Cleveland 14–0
- Milwaukee – (2:31) Damian Harrell 25-yard pass from R.J. Archer (Garrett Lindholm kick), Cleveland 14–7
- Cleveland – (2:00) Troy Bergeron 58-yard kickoff return (Matt Denny kick failed), Cleveland 20–7

2nd quarter

- Milwaukee – (12:48) Mykel Benson 1-yard run (Garrett Lindholm kick blocked), Cleveland 20–13
- Milwaukee – (5:26) Damian Harrell 19-yard pass from R.J. Archer (Garrett Lindholm kick), Tied 20–20
- Cleveland – (0:00) Matt Denny 18-yard field goal, Cleveland 23–20

3rd quarter

- Milwaukee – (10:50) Troy Bergeron 10-yard pass from Dan Whalen (Matt Denny kick), Milwaukee 27–23
- Cleveland – (1:01) Mykel Benson 1-yard run (Garrett Lindholm kick), Cleveland 30–27

4th quarter

- Cleveland – (9:34) Dan Whalen 1-yard run (Matt Denny kick), Cleveland 37–27
- Cleveland – (5:45) Troy Bergeron 3-yard pass from Dan Whalen (Matt Denny kick failed), Cleveland 43–27
- Milwaukee – (1:10) Brent Holmes 8-yard pass from R.J. Archer (R.J. Archer pass failed), Cleveland 43–33
- Cleveland – (0:47) Dan Whalen 8-yard run (Matt Denny kick), Cleveland 50–33
- Milwaukee – (0:32) Brent Holmes 5-yard pass from R.J. Archer (R.J. Archer pass), Cleveland 50–41

Passing

- Milwaukee – R.J. Archer: 22/31, 244 yards, 4 TD, 1 INT
- Cleveland – Kurt Rocco: 12/20, 146 yards, 1 TD

Rushing

- Milwaukee – Mykel Benson: 10 att, 34 yards, 2 TD
- Cleveland – Dan Whalen: 4 att, 17 yards, 2 TD

Receiving

- Milwaukee – Damian Harrell: 8 rec, 102 yards, 2 TD
- Cleveland – Troy Bergeron: 7 rec, 81 yards, 2 TD

=== Week 10: at Utah Blaze ===
Week 10: Milwaukee Mustangs at Utah Blaze – Game summary

Quarter	1	2	3	4	Total
Mustangs	24	9	3	29	65
Blaze	6	13	14	20	53

at EnergySolutions Arena, Salt Lake City, Utah

- Date: May 14
- Game time: 9:00 p.m. CDT
- Game attendance: 7,667
- Referee: David Cutaia
- Recap

Game information

1st quarter

- Milwaukee – (12:28) Garrett Lindholm 19-yard field goal, Milwaukee 3–0
- Utah – (9:39) Aaron Lesue 21-yard pass from Tommy Grady (Greg Gunderson kick failed), Utah 6–3
- Milwaukee – (4:27) Dwayne Eley Jr. 47-yard pass from R.J. Archer (Garrett Lindholm kick), Milwaukee 10–6
- Milwaukee – (1:46) Mykel Benson 1-yard run (Garrett Lindholm kick), Milwaukee 17–6
- Milwaukee – (0:00) Mykel Benson 4-yard run (Garrett Lindholm kick), Milwaukee 24–6

2nd quarter

- Utah – (12:10) Aaron Lesue 5-yard pass from Tommy Grady (Greg Gunderson kick), Milwaukee 24–13
- Milwaukee – (9:45) Dwayne Eley Jr. 44-yard pass from R.J. Archer (Eric Ward rush failed), Milwaukee 30–13
- Milwaukee – (1:18) Garrett Lindholm 23-yard field goal, Milwaukee 33–13
- Utah – (0:00) Eddie Jackson 9-yard pass from Tommy Grady (Tommy Grady pass failed), Milwaukee 33–19

3rd quarter

- Milwaukee – (10:07) Garrett Lindholm 17-yard field goal, Milwaukee 36–19
- Utah – (7:03) Alvance Robinson 6-yard pass from Tommy Grady (Greg Gunderson kick), Milwaukee 36–26
- Utah – (0:09) Aaron Boone 6-yard pass from Tommy Grady (Greg Gunderson kick), Milwaukee 36–33

4th quarter

- Utah – (11:32) Aaron Boone 8-yard pass from Tommy Grady (Greg Gunderson kick failed), Utah 39–36
- Milwaukee – (8:07) Brent Holmes 1-yard run (Garrett Lindholm drop-kick failed), Milwaukee 42–39
- Milwaukee – (6:49) Marcus Everett 0-yard fumble recovery (Garrett Lindholm kick), Milwaukee 49–39
- Utah – (2:11) Aaron Boone 13-yard pass from Tommy Grady (Greg Gunderson kick), Milwaukee 49–46
- Milwaukee – (0:58) Mykel Benson 5-yard run (Garrett Lindholm kick), Milwaukee 56–46
- Utah – (0:30) Aaron Boone 17-yard pass from Tommy Grady (Greg Gunderson kick), Milwaukee 56–53
- Milwaukee – (0:17) Garrett Lindholm 25-yard field goal, Milwaukee 59–53
- Milwaukee – (0:00) Kelvin Rogers 52-yard interception return, Milwaukee 65–53

Passing

- Milwaukee – R.J. Archer: 19/28, 304 yards, 2 TD
- Utah – Tommy Grady: 28/48, 296 yards, 8 TD, 1 INT

Rushing

- Milwaukee – Mykel Benson: 12 att, 18 yards, 3 TD
- Utah – Tommy Grady: 2 att, 0 yards

Receiving

- Milwaukee – Dwayne Eley Jr.: 3 rec, 98 yards, 2 TD
- Utah – Aaron Boone: 10 rec, 89 yards, 4 TD

=== Week 12: vs. Orlando Predators ===
Week 12: Orlando Predators at Milwaukee Mustangs – Game summary

Quarter	1	2	3	4	Total
Predators	7	0	14	14	35
Mustangs	6	0	10	14	30

at Bradley Center, Milwaukee, Wisconsin

- Date: May 26
- Game time: 7:00 p.m. CDT
- Game attendance: 3,348
- Referee: Tony Cannella
- Recap

Game information

1st quarter

- Milwaukee – (9:16) Garrett Lindholm 22-yard field goal, Milwaukee 3–0
- Milwaukee – (3:06) Garrett Lindholm 21-yard field goal, Milwaukee 6–0
- Orlando – (2:36) T.T. Toliver 18-yard pass from Nick Hill (Mark Lewis kick), Orlando 7–6

2nd quarter

No scoring

3rd quarter

- Milwaukee – (13:38) Kelvin Rodgers 35-yard interception return (Garrett Lindholm kick), Milwaukee 13–7
- Orlando – (10:49) Jamarr Ward 1-yard run (Mark Lewis kick), Orlando 14–13
- Milwaukee – (4:18) Garrett Lindholm 29-yard field goal, Milwaukee 16–14
- Orlando – (2:03) Robert Quiroga 30-yard pass from Nick Hill (Mark Lewis kick), Orlando 21–16

4th quarter

- Milwaukee – (13:20) Damian Harrell 20-yard pass from R.J. Archer (R.J. Archer pass), Milwaukee 24–21
- Orlando – (10:03) T.T. Toliver 8-yard pass from Nick Hill (Mark Lewis kick), Orlando 28–24
- Orlando – (3:28) Bobby Sippio 5-yard pass from Nick Hill (Mark Lewis kick), Orlando 35–24
- Milwaukee – (0:50) Marcus Everett 5-yard pass from R.J. Archer, Orlando 35–30

Passing

- Orlando – Nick Hill: 15/26, 224 yards, 4 TD, 3 INT
- Milwaukee – R.J. Archer: 21/43, 183 yards, 2 TD, 3 INT

Rushing

- Orlando – Nick Hill: 5 att, 26 yards
- Milwaukee – Mykel Benson: 5 att, 18 yards

Receiving

- Orlando – Robert Quiroga: 7 rec, 121 yards, 1 TD
- Milwaukee – Damian Harrell: 9 rec, 100 yards, 1 TD

=== Week 13: at Philadelphia Soul ===
Week 13: Milwaukee Mustangs at Philadelphia Soul – Game summary

Quarter	1	2	3	4	Total
Mustangs	0	10	13	14	37
Soul	0	14	6	19	39

at Wells Fargo Center, Philadelphia, Pennsylvania

- Date: June 3
- Game time: 6:00 p.m. CDT
- Game attendance: 7,681
- Referee: Jim Corpora
- Recap

Game information

1st quarter

No scoring

2nd quarter

- Philadelphia – (12:13) Brandon Perkins 0-yard fumble recovery (Jon Strictsky kick), Philadelphia 7–0
- Milwaukee – (6:51) Damian Harrell 25-yard pass from R.J. Archer (Garrett Lindholm kick), Tied 7–7
- Philadelphia – (0:55) Syvelle Newton 13-yard pass from Ryan Vena (Jon Strictsky kick), Philadelphia 14–7
- Milwaukee – (0:00) Garrett Lindholm 22-yard field goal, Philadelphia 14–10

3rd quarter

- Milwaukee – Mykel Benson 1-yard run (Garrett Lindholm kick), Milwaukee 17–14
- Philadelphia – (6:26) Larry Brackins 5-yard pass from Ryan Vena (Jon Strictsky kick failed), Philadelphia 20–17
- Milwaukee – (0:23) Mykel Benson 2-yard run (Garrett Lindholm kick failed), Milwaukee 23–20

4th quarter

- Philadelphia – (11:41) Donovan Morgan 20-yard pass from Ryan Vena (Jon Strictsky kick), Philadelphia 27–23
- Milwaukee – (2:46) Marcus Everett 3-yard run (Garrett Lindholm kick), Milwaukee 30–27
- Philadelphia – (1:01) Donovan Morgan 43-yard pass from Ryan Vena, Philadelphia 33–30
- Milwaukee – (0:55) Mykel Benson 4-yard run (Garrett Lindholm kick), Milwaukee 37–33
- Philadelphia – (0:00) Donovan Morgan 4-yard pass from Ryan Vena (Ryan Vena rush failed), Philadelphia 39–37

Passing

- Milwaukee – D. Bryant: 21/37, 188 yards, 1 TD, 1 INT
- Philadelphia – Ryan Vena: 19/31, 214 yards, 5 TD, 2 INT

Rushing

- Milwaukee – Mykel Benson: 8 att, 18 yards, 3 TD
- Philadelphia – Ryan Vena: 5 att, 11 yards

Receiving

- Milwaukee – Brent Holmes: 9 rec, 89 yards
- Philadelphia – Donovan Morgan: 7 rec, 110 yards, 3 TD

=== Week 14: vs. Kansas City Command ===
Week 14: Kansas City Command at Milwaukee Mustangs – Game summary

Quarter	1	2	3	4	Total
Command	7	14	7	6	34
Mustangs	14	7	10	23	54

at Bradley Center, Milwaukee, Wisconsin

- Date: June 11
- Game time: 7:00 p.m. CDT
- Game attendance: 5,249
- Referee: Tony Cannella
- Recap

Game information

1st quarter

- Milwaukee – (6:49) Dwayne Eley Jr. 17-yard pass from R.J. Archer (Garrett Lindholm kick), Milwaukee 7–0
- Kansas City – (3:42) Steven Savoy 4-yard run (Brian Umstead kick), Tied 7–7
- Milwaukee – (1:13) Dwayne Eley Jr. 11-yard pass from R.J. Archer (Garrett Lindholm kick), Milwaukee 14–7

2nd quarter

- Kansas City – (11:39) Steven Savoy 2-yard run (Brian Umstead kick), Tied 14–14
- Kansas City – (4:56) Steven Savoy 1-yard run (Brian Umstead kick), Kansas City 21–14
- Milwaukee – (0:39) Mykel Benson 8-yard pass from R.J. Archer (Garrett Lindholm kick), Tied 21–21

3rd quarter

- Milwaukee – (10:32) Dwayne Eley Jr. 6-yard pass from R.J. Archer (Garrett Lindholm kick), Milwaukee 28–21
- Milwaukee – (5:02) Garrett Lindholm 19-yard field goal, Milwaukee 31–21
- Kansas City – (3:13) Bradly Chavez 5-yard pass from J.J. Raterink (Brian Umstead kick), Milwaukee 31–28

4th quarter

- Milwaukee – (11:35) R.J. Archer 1-yard run (Garrett Lindholm kick), Milwaukee 38–28
- Milwaukee – (6:44) Dwayne Eley Jr. 30-yard pass from R.J. Archer (Garrett Lindholm kick), Milwaukee 45–28
- Kansas City – (2:59) Steven Savoy 1-yard pass from J.J. Raterink (Brian Umstead kick failed), Milwaukee 45–34
- Milwaukee – (0:44) Garrett Lindholm 18-yard field goal, Milwaukee 48–34
- Milwaukee – (0:00) Andre Jones 51-yard interception return, Milwaukee 54–34

Passing

- Kansas City – J.J. Raterink: 16/35, 222 yards, 2 TD, 2 INT
- Milwaukee – Ryan Vena: 20/31, 236 yards, 5 TD

Rushing

- Kansas City – Steven Savoy: 5 att, 8 yards, 3 TD
- Milwaukee – Mykel Benson: 6 att, 6 yards

Receiving

- Kansas City – Steven Savoy: 5 rec, 64 yards, 1 TD
- Milwaukee – Dwayne Eley Jr.: 9 rec, 127 yards, 4 TD

=== Week 15: at Jacksonville Sharks ===
Week 15: Milwaukee Mustangs at Jacksonville Sharks – Game summary

Quarter	1	2	3	4	Total
Mustangs	7	13	14	13	47
Sharks	6	21	7	28	62

at Jacksonville Veterans Memorial Arena, Jacksonville, Florida

- Date: June 18
- Game time: 6:00 p.m. CDT
- Game attendance: 10,120
- Referee: Kevin Stine
- Recap

Game information

1st quarter

- Jacksonville – (10:30) Jomo Wilson 25-yard pass from Aaron Garcia (Marco Capozzoli kick failed), Jacksonville 6–0
- Milwaukee – (3:28) Dwayne Lefall 19-yard fumble recovery (Garrett Lindholm kick), Milwaukee 7–6

2nd quarter

- Jacksonville – (14:55) Jeff Hughley 7-yard pass from Aaron Garcia (Marco Capozzoli kick), Jacksonville 13–7
- Milwaukee – (8:19) Mykel Benson 1-yard run (Garrett Lindholm kick), Milwaukee 14–13
- Jacksonville – (4:11) Jamarko Simmons 1-yard run (Marco Capozzoli kick), Jacksonville 20–14
- Jacksonville – (0:55) Jomo Wilson 14-yard pass from Aaron Garcia (Marco Capozzoli kick), Jacksonville 27–14
- Milwaukee – (0:44) Mykel Benson 3-yard run (Garrett Lindholm kick failed), Jacksonville 27–20

3rd quarter

- Milwaukee – (6:16) Dwayne Eley Jr. 5-yard pass from R.J. Archer (Garrett Lindholm kick), Tied 27–27
- Jacksonville – (4:20) Jeff Hughley 28-yard pass from Aaron Garcia (Marco Capozzoli kick), Jacksonville 34–27
- Milwaukee – (3:16) Kelvin Rodgers 57-yard kickoff return (Garrett Lindholm kick), Tied 34–34

4th quarter

- Jacksonville – (13:25) Jomo Wilson 5-yard pass from Aaron Garcia (Marco Capozzoli kick failed), Jacksonville 40–34
- Jacksonville – (11:21) LaRoche Jackson 23-yard interception return (Jeff Hughley rush), Jacksonville 48–34
- Milwaukee – (6:47) Mykel Benson 1-yard run (Garrett Lindholm kick), Jacksonville 48–41
- Jacksonville – (5:06) Jamarko Simmons 13-yard pass from Aaron Garcia (Marco Capozzoli kick), Jacksonville 55–41
- Milwaukee – (1:04) Jason Jones 5-yard pass from R.J. Archer (Garrett Lindholm kick blocked), Jacksonville 55–47
- Jacksonville – (0:52) Jeff Hughley 7-yard pass from Aaron Garcia (Marco Capozzoli kick), Jacksonville 62–47

Passing

- Milwaukee – Bryan Lee-Lauduski: 21/36, 186 yards, 2 TD, 2 INT
- Jacksonville – Aaron Garcia: 28/36, 307 yards, 7 TD, 1 INT

Rushing

- Milwaukee – Mykel Benson: 8 att, 9 yards, 3 TD
- Jacksonville – Jamarko Simmons: 1 att, 1 yard, 1 TD

Receiving

- Milwaukee – Dwayne Eley Jr.: 5 rec, 67 yards, 1 TD
- Jacksonville – Jeff Hughley: 12 rec, 147 yards, 3 TD

=== Week 16: at Pittsburgh Power ===
Week 16: Milwaukee Mustangs at Pittsburgh Power – Game summary

Quarter	1	2	3	4	Total
Mustangs	3	14	7	14	38
Power	13	13	0	13	39

at Consol Energy Center, Pittsburgh, Pennsylvania

- Date: June 25
- Game time: 6:30 p.m. CDT
- Game attendance: 8,227
- Referee: Jim Corpora
- Recap

Game information

1st quarter

- Milwaukee – (8:23) Garrett Lindholm 17-yard field goal, Milwaukee 3–0
- Pittsburgh – (6:11) Lonnell Dewalt 21-yard pass from Chris Wallace (Paul Edinger kick), Pittsburgh 7–3
- Pittsburgh – (3:06) Bernard Lay 31-yard interception return (Paul Edinger kick failed), Pittsburgh 13–3

2nd quarter

- Milwaukee – (13:37) Antoine Burns 4-yard pass from Gino Guidugli (Garrett Lindholm kick), Pittsburgh 13–10
- Pittsburgh – (9:42) Michael Washington 27-yard pass from Chris Wallace (Paul Edinger kick), Pittsburgh 20–10
- Milwaukee – (6:15) Antoine Burns 19-yard pass from Gino Guidugli (Garrett Lindholm kick), Pittsburgh 20–17
- Pittsburgh – (2:59) Michael Washington 33-yard pass from Chris Wallace (Paul Edinger kick failed), Pittsburgh 26–17

3rd quarter

- Milwaukee – (12:54) Dwayne Eley Jr. 9-yard pass from Gino Guidugli (Garrett Lindholm kick), Pittsburgh 26–24

4th quarter

- Milwaukee – (12:45) Dwayne Eley Jr. 8-yard pass from Gino Guidugli (Garrett Lindholm kick), Milwaukee 31–26
- Milwaukee – (7:49) Dwayne Eley Jr. 33-yard pass from Gino Guidugli (Garrett Lindholm kick), Milwaukee 38–26
- Pittsburgh – (4:52) Irvin Campbell 12-yard pass from Chris Wallace (Paul Edinger kick failed), Milwaukee 38–32
- Pittsburgh – (0:00) Lonnell Dewalt 16-yard pass from Chris Wallace (Paul Edinger kick), Pittsburgh 39–38

Passing

- Milwaukee – Gino Guidugli: 21/34, 237 yards, 5 TD, 2 INT
- Pittsburgh – Chris Wallace: 19/33, 253 yards, 5 TD, 1 INT

Rushing

- Milwaukee – Gino Guidugli: 5 att, 9 yards
- Pittsburgh – Chris Wallace: 4 att, 13 yards

Receiving

- Milwaukee – Dwayne Eley Jr.: 11 rec, 144 yards, 3 TD
- Pittsburgh – Michael Washington: 5 rec, 72 yards, 2 TD

=== Week 17: vs. Cleveland Gladiators ===
Week 17: Cleveland Gladiators at Milwaukee Mustangs – Game summary

Quarter	1	2	3	4	Total
Gladiators	7	14	21	20	62
Mustangs	7	14	7	30	58

at Bradley Center, Milwaukee, Wisconsin

- Date: July 2
- Game time: 7:00 p.m. CDT
- Game attendance: 5,633
- Referee: Tom Mccabe
- Recap

Game information

1st quarter

- Cleveland – (10:33) Dominick Goodman 8-yard pass from Kurt Rocco (Matt Denny kick), Cleveland 7–0
- Milwaukee – (3:55) Dwayne Eley Jr. 6-yard pass from Gino Guidugli (Garrett Lindholm kick), Tied 7–7

2nd quarter

- Milwaukee – (14:32) Dwayne Eley Jr. 20-yard pass from Gino Guidugli (Garrett Lindholm kick), Milwaukee 14–7
- Cleveland – (9:07) Kurt Rocco 1-yard run (Matt Denny kick), Tied 14–14
- Milwaukee – (5:56) Victor Williams 8-yard pass from Gino Guidugli (Garrett Lindholm kick), Milwaukee 21–14
- Cleveland – (0:50) Anthony Hoke 5-yard fumble recovery (Matt Denny kick), Tied 21–21

3rd quarter

- Milwaukee – (9:59) Justin Lawrence 1-yard run (Garrett Lindholm kick), Milwaukee 28–21
- Cleveland – (5:48) Troy Bergeron 29-yard pass from Kurt Rocco (Matt Denny kick), Tied 28–28
- Cleveland – (3:34) Robert Redd 22-yard pass from Kurt Rocco (Matt Denny kick), Cleveland 35–28
- Cleveland – (0:49) Mike Bragg 16-yard interception return (Matt Denny kick), Cleveland 42–28

4th quarter

- Milwaukee – (12:02) Dwayne Eley Jr. 23-yard pass from Gino Guidugli (Garrett Lindholm kick), Cleveland 42–35
- Cleveland – (9:36) Kurt Rocco 3-yard run (Matt Denny kick), Cleveland 49–35
- Milwaukee – (6:15) Gino Guidugli 4-yard run (Garrett Lindholm kick), Milwaukee 49–42
- Milwaukee – (4:33) Gino Guidugli 1-yard run (Garrett Lindholm kick), Tied 49–49
- Cleveland – (1:32) Troy Bergeron 15-yard pass from Kurt Rocco (Matt Denny kick blocked), Cleveland 55–49
- Milwaukee – (1:32) Brand Brinkley PAT return, Cleveland 55–51
- Milwaukee – (0:41) Dwayne Eley Jr. 41-yard pass from Gino Guidugli (Garrett Lindholm kick), Milwaukee 58–55
- Cleveland – (0:03) Kurt Rocco 8-yard run (Matt Denny kick), Cleveland 62–48

Passing

- Cleveland – Kurt Rocco: 20/36, 257 yards, 4 TD, 1 INT
- Milwaukee – Gino Guidugli: 23/33, 285 yards, 5 TD, 1 INT

Rushing

- Cleveland – Kurt Rocco: 3 att, 12 yards, 3 TD
- Milwaukee – Gino Guidugli: 3 att, 10 yards, 1 TD

Receiving

- Cleveland – Thyron Lewis: 7 rec, 113 yards, 2 TD
- Milwaukee – Dwayne Eley Jr.: 8 rec, 143 yards, 4 TD

=== Week 18: at New Orleans VooDoo ===
Week 18: Milwaukee Mustangs at New Orleans VooDoo – Game summary

Quarter	1	2	3	4	Total
Mustangs	21	21	13	21	76
VooDoo	14	13	7	21	55

at New Orleans Arena, New Orleans, Louisiana

- Date: July 8
- Game time: 6:00 p.m. CDT
- Game attendance: 9,359
- Referee: Chris Snead
- Recap

Game information

1st quarter

- New Orleans – (10:16) Skyler Green 14-yard pass from D. Bryant (Jonathan Ruffin kick), New Orleans 7–0
- Milwaukee – (8:31) Victor Williams 26-yard pass from Gino Guidugli (Garrett Lindholm kick), Tied 7–7
- New Orleans – (4:29) P.J. Berry 3-yard run (Jonathan Ruffin kick), New Orleans 14–7
- Milwaukee – (2:36) Dwayne Eley Jr. 19-yard pass from Gino Guidugli (Garrett Lindholm kick), Tied 14–14
- Milwaukee – (1:02) Justin Lawrence 5-yard run (Garrett Lindholm kick), Milwaukee 21–14

2nd quarter

- New Orleans – (14:52) D. Bryant 1-yard run (Jonathan Ruffin rush fumbled), Milwaukee 21–20
- Milwaukee – (9:53) Victor Williams 10-yard pass from Gino Guidugli (Garrett Lindholm kick), Milwaukee 28–20
- New Orleans – (6:20) P.J. Berry 6-yard pass from D. Bryant (Jonathan Ruffin kick), Milwaukee 28–27
- Milwaukee – (1:15) Justin Lawrence 2-yard run (Garrett Lindholm kick), Milwaukee 35–27
- Milwaukee – (0:22) Justin Lawrence 3-yard fumble recovery (Garrett Lindholm kick), Milwaukee 42–27

3rd quarter

- Milwaukee – (9:11) Justin Lawrence 3-yard run (Garrett Lindholm kick failed), Milwaukee 48–27
- Milwaukee – (3:35) Brandon Brinkley 46-yard interception return (Garrett Lindholm kick), Milwaukee 55–27
- New Orleans – (0:28) Skyler Green 17-yard pass from Danny Wimprine (Jonathan Ruffin kick), Milwaukee 55–34

4th quarter

- Milwaukee – (11:37) Justin Lawrence 1-yard run (Garrett Lindholm kick), Milwaukee 62–34
- New Orleans – (10:34) Carlese Franklin 30-yard pass from Danny Wimprine (Jonathan Ruffin kick), Milwaukee 62–41
- Milwaukee – (9:57) Eddie Davis 8-yard kickoff return (Garrett Lindholm kick), Milwaukee 69–41
- New Orleans – (6:28) Tom Taggert 1-yard run (Jonathan Ruffin kick), Milwaukee 69–48
- Milwaukee – (2:04) Victor Williams 35-yard pass from Gino Guidugli (Garrett Lindholm kick), Milwaukee 76–48
- New Orleans – (0:13) L.J. Castile 3-yard pass from Danny Wimprine (Jonathan Ruffin kick), Milwaukee 76–55

Passing

- Milwaukee – Gino Guidugli: 21/31, 283 yards, 4 TD
- New Orleans – D. Bryant: 16/24, 179 yards, 2 TD, 1 INT

Rushing

- Milwaukee – Justin Lawrence: 5 att, 12 yards, 4 TD
- New Orleans – P.J. Berry: 3 att, 12 yards, 1 TD

Receiving

- Milwaukee – Victor Williams: 7 rec, 115 yards, 3 TD
- New Orleans – Skyler Green: 9 rec, 110 yards, 2 TD

=== Week 19: vs. Iowa Barnstormers ===
Week 19: Iowa Barnstormers at Milwaukee Mustangs– Game summary

Quarter	1	2	3	4	Total
Barnstormers	14	21	7	7	49
Mustangs	13	16	13	41	83

at Bradley Center, Milwaukee, Wisconsin

- Date: July 15
- Game time: 7:00 p.m. CDT
- Game attendance: 5,077
- Referee: Tony Cannella
- Recap

Game information

1st quarter

- Milwaukee – (11:54) Ernest Smith 21-yard pass from Gino Guidugli (Garrett Lindholm kick failed), Milwaukee 6–0
- Iowa – (9:18) Jesse Schmidt 9-yard pass from Bryan Lee-Laudusky (Nick Pertuit kick), Iowa 7–6
- Milwaukee – (3:06) Brandon LeFall 40-yard run (Garrett Lindholm kick), Milwaukee 13–7
- Iowa – (0:50) Everett Roberts 14-yard pass from Bryan Lee-Laudusky (Nick Pertuit kick), Iowa 14–13

2nd quarter

- Milwaukee – (13:14) Dwayne Eley Jr. 10-yard pass from Gino Guidugli (Garrett Lindholm kick), Milwaukee 20–14
- Iowa – (11:59) Jesse Schmidt 11-yard pass from Bryan Lee-Laudusky (Nick Pertuit kick), Iowa 21–20
- Iowa – (5:02) Brian Villanueva 1-yard run (Nick Pertuit kick), Iowa 28–20
- Milwaukee – (2:34) Mykel Benson 3-yard run (Garrett Lindholm kick blocked), Iowa 28–26
- Iowa – (0:12) Errick McCown 12-yard pass from Bryan Lee-Laudusky (Nick Pertuit kick), Iowa 35–26
- Milwaukee – (0:00) Garrett Lindholm 34-yard field goal, Iowa 35–29

3rd quarter

- Milwaukee – (11:09) Victor Williams 18-yard pass from Gino Guidugli (Gino Guidugli pass failed), Tied 35–35
- Milwaukee – (4:45) Victor Williams 31-yard pass from Gino Guidugli (Garrett Lindholm kick), Milwaukee 42–35
- Iowa – (2:23) Rodney Filer 4-yard run (Nick Pertuit kick), Tied 42–42

4th quarter

- Milwaukee – (13:50) Mykel Benson 4-yard run (Garrett Lindholm kick), Milwaukee 49–42
- Milwaukee – (12:51) Marcus Everett 3-yard fumble return (Garrett Lindholm kick), Milwaukee 56–42
- Iowa – (11:13) Jesse Schmidt 8-yard pass from Bryan Lee-Laudusky (Nick Pertuit kick), Milwaukee 56–49
- Milwaukee – (7:46) Ernest Smith 22-yard pass from Gino Guidugli (Garrett Lindholm kick), Milwaukee 63–49
- Milwaukee – (2:01) Ernest Smith 24-yard pass from Gino Guidugli (Garrett Lindholm kick), Milwaukee 70–49
- Milwaukee – (0:51) Marcus Everett 4-yard interception return (Garrett Lindholm kick), Milwaukee 77–49
- Milwaukee – (0:44) Justin Lawrence 10-yard interception return (Gino Guidugli pass failed), Milwaukee 83–49

Passing

- Iowa – Bryan Lee-Laudusky: 22/36, 255 yards, 5 TD, 3 INT
- Milwaukee – Gino Guidugli: 22/31, 278 yards, 6 TD

Rushing

- Iowa – Rodney Filer: 5 att, 31 yards, 1 TD
- Milwaukee – Dwayne LeFall: 1 att, 40 yards, 1 TD

Receiving

- Iowa – Jesse Schmidt: 12 rec, 147 yards, 3 TD
- Milwaukee – Ernest Smith: 6 rec, 113 yards, 3 TD

=== Week 20: at Chicago Rush ===
Week 20: Milwaukee Mustangs at Chicago Rush – Game summary

Quarter	1	2	3	4	Total
Mustangs	9	21	14	10	54
Rush	6	14	7	14	41

at Allstate Arena, Rosemont, Illinois

- Date: July 23
- Game time: 7:00 p.m. CDT
- Game attendance: 10,269
- Referee: Jim Corpora
- Recap

Game information

1st quarter

- Milwaukee – (12:19) Broderick Stewart 0-yard fumble recovery (Garrett Lindholm kick failed), Milwaukee 6–0
- Milwaukee – (8:45) Garrett Lindholm 19-yard field goal, Milwaukee 9–0
- Chicago – (2:06) Reggie Gray 7-yard pass from J.J. Raterink (Chris Gould kick failed), Milwaukee 9–6

2nd quarter

- Milwaukee – (13:09) Ernest Smith 10-yard run (Garrett Lindholm kick), Milwaukee 16–6
- Milwaukee – (8:52) Mykel Benson 2-yard run (Garrett Lindholm kick), Milwaukee 23–6
- Milwaukee – (7:27) Broderick Stewart 0-yard fumble recovery (Garrett Lindholm kick), Milwaukee 30–6
- Chicago – (4:53) Reggie Gray 33-yard pass from Dominick Randolph (Chris Gould kick), Milwaukee 30–13
- Chicago – (0:14) Reggie Gray 9-yard pass from Dominick Randolph (Chris Gould kick), Milwaukee 30–20

3rd quarter

- Milwaukee – (13:58) Dwayne Eley Jr. 16-yard pass from Gino Guidugli (Garrett Lindholm kick), Milwaukee 37–20
- Milwaukee – (9:43) Victor Williams 31-yard pass from Gino Guidugli (Garrett Lindholm kick), Milwaukee 44–20
- Chicago – (3:46) Charles Dillon 1-yard run (Chris Gould kick), Milwaukee 44–27

4th quarter

- Milwaukee – (10:58) Garrett Lindholm 19-yard field goal, Milwaukee 47–27
- Chicago – (8:34) Reggie Gray 26-yard pass from J.J. Raterink (Chris Gould kick), Milwaukee 47–34
- Milwaukee – (4:42) Dwayne Eley Jr. 13-yard pass from Gino Guidugli (Garrett Lindholm kick), Milwaukee 54–34
- Chicago – (3:05) Reggie Gray 16-yard pass from Dominick Randolph (Chris Gould kick), Milwaukee 54–41

Passing

- Milwaukee – Gino Guidugli: 18/28, 193 yards, 3 TD, 1 INT
- Chicago – Dominic Randolph: 11/16, 167 yards, 3 TD, 2 INT

Rushing

- Milwaukee – Mykel Benson: 8 att, 17 yards, 1 TD
- Chicago – Johnie Kirton: 5 att, 7 yards

Receiving

- Milwaukee – Victor Williams: 5 rec, 60 yards, 1 TD
- Chicago – Reggie Gray: 9 rec, 123 yards, 5 TD
