= 2011 Pittsburgh Power season =

Season of American football

- Head coach: Chris Siegfried
- Home stadium: Consol Energy Center

Results
- Record: 9–9
- Division place: 2nd
- Playoffs: Did not qualify

The 2011 Pittsburgh Power season was the first season for the franchise in the Arena Football League. The team was coached by Chris Siegfried and played their home games at Consol Energy Center. In their inaugural season, the Power finished 9–9, missing the playoffs.

== Standings ==
East Division
Team	W	L	PCT	PF	PA	DIV	CON	Home	Away
y-Cleveland Gladiators	10	8	.556	904	842	4–2	6–5	7–2	3–6
Pittsburgh Power	9	9	.500	870	972	4–2	5–6	5–4	4–5
Milwaukee Mustangs	7	11	.389	872	867	1–5	3–8	4–5	3–6
Philadelphia Soul	6	12	.333	914	969	3–3	5–6	4–5	2–7

y - Clinched division

== Regular season schedule ==
Pittsburgh's inaugural season began at home against the Philadelphia Soul on March 11. They traveled to Philadelphia on July 23 for their final regular season game.

Week	Day	Date	Kickoff (ET)	TV	Opponent	Results		Location	Report
Week	Day	Date	Kickoff (ET)	TV	Opponent	Score	Record	Location	Report
1	Friday	March 11	8:00 p.m.	NFL Network	Philadelphia Soul	L 52–58 (OT)	0–1	Consol Energy Center	
2	Saturday	March 19	7:30 p.m.	WPCW	Iowa Barnstormers	W 58–28	1–1	Consol Energy Center	
3	Monday	March 28	7:30 p.m.		at Milwaukee Mustangs	W 49–47	2–1	Bradley Center	
4	Saturday	April 2	7:30 p.m.	WPCW	Tulsa Talons	L 22–45	2–2	Consol Energy Center	
5	Bye								
6	Saturday	April 16	7:30 p.m.	WPCW	Jacksonville Sharks	L 40–65	2–3	Consol Energy Center	
7	Thursday	April 21	8:05 p.m.		at New Orleans VooDoo	W 56–49	3–3	New Orleans Arena	
8	Saturday	April 30	7:30 p.m.		at Georgia Force	L 39–58	3–4	Arena at Gwinnett Center	
9	Saturday	May 7	8:00 p.m.	WPCW	Spokane Shock	W 51–41	4–4	Consol Energy Center	
10	Saturday	May 14	7:30 p.m.	WPCW	San Jose SaberCats	W 54–48	5–4	Consol Energy Center	
11	Bye								
12	Saturday	May 28	8:30 p.m.		at Dallas Vigilantes	W 76–75	6–4	American Airlines Center	
13	Saturday	June 4	7:30 p.m.	WPCW	Cleveland Gladiators	W 35–32	7–4	Consol Energy Center	
14	Saturday	June 11	7:30 p.m.		at Tampa Bay Storm	L 55–62	7–5	St. Pete Times Forum	
15	Saturday	June 18	9:00 p.m.		at Utah Blaze	L 40–81	7–6	EnergySolutions Arena	
16	Saturday	June 25	7:30 p.m.	WPCW	Milwaukee Mustangs	W 39–38	8–6	Consol Energy Center	
17	Friday	July 1	8:00 p.m.	NFL Network	at Orlando Predators	L 54–62	8–7	Amway Center	
18	Sunday	July 10	7:30 p.m.	WPCW	Arizona Rattlers	L 34–68	8–8	Consol Energy Center	
19	Friday	July 15	8:00 p.m.	NFL Network	at Cleveland Gladiators	L 55–67	8–9	Quicken Loans Arena	
20	Friday	July 22	7:05 p.m.		at Philadelphia Soul	W 61–48	9–9	Wells Fargo Center	

== Regular season ==
=== Week 1: vs. Philadelphia Soul ===
Week 1: Philadelphia Soul at Pittsburgh Power – Game summary

Quarter	1	2	3	4	OT	Total
Soul	7	17	13	15	6	58
Power	21	6	7	18	0	52

at Consol Energy Center, Pittsburgh, Pennsylvania

- Date: March 11
- Game time: 8:00 p.m. EST
- Game attendance: 13,904
- Referee: Perry Havener
- Recap

Game information

1st quarter

- Pittsburgh – (13:47) Jason Willis 37-yard pass from Bernard Morris (Paul Edinger kick), Pittsburgh 7–0
- Philadelphia – (10:02) Donovan Morgan 46-yard from Justin Allgood (James Paul kick), Tied 7–7
- Pittsburgh – (7:37) Michael Washington 21-yard pass from Bernard Morris (Paul Edinger kick), Pittsburgh 14–7
- Pittsburgh – (3:32) Lonnell Dewalt 14-yard pass from Bernard Morris (Paul Edinger kick), Pittsburgh 21–7

2nd quarter

- Philadelphia – (11:57) Donovan Morgan 5-yard pass from Justin Allgood (James Paul kick), Pittsburgh 21–14
- Pittsburgh – (8:46) Joshua Rue 2-yard run (Paul Edinger kick failed), Pittsburgh 27–14
- Philadelphia – (4:08) Donovan Morgan 2-yard run (James Paul kick), Pittsburgh 27–21
- Philadelphia – (0:00) James Paul 18-yard field goal, Pittsburgh 27–24

3rd quarter

- Philadelphia – (10:01) Ryan Vena 1-yard run (James Paul kick failed), Philadelphia 30–27
- Philadelphia – (4:27) Donovan Morgan 20-yard pass from Justin Allgood (James Paul kick), Philadelphia 37–27
- Pittsburgh – (2:13) Lonnell Dewalt 5-yard pass from Bernard Morris (Paul Edinger kick), Philadelphia 37–34

4th quarter

- Philadelphia – (14:54) Donovan Morgan 3-yard pass from Justin Allgood (James Paul kick), Philadelphia 44–34
- Pittsburgh – (11:08) Joshua Rue 1-yard run (Paul Edinger kick), Philadelphia 44–41
- Philadelphia – (5:55) Donovan Morgan 17-yard pass from Justin Allgood (James Paul kick failed), Philadelphia 50–41
- Pittsburgh – (0:53) Jason Willis 7-yard pass from Bernard Morris (Lonnell Dewalt pass), Philadelphia 50–49
- Philadelphia – (0:12) Team safety, Philadelphia 52–49
- Pittsburgh – (0:00) Paul Edinger 35-yard field goal, Tied 52–52

Overtime –

- Philadelphia – Mike Brown 15-yard interception return, Philadelphia 58–52

Passing

- Philadelphia – Justin Allgood: 25/36, 300 yards, 5 TD
- Pittsburgh – Bernard Morris: 24/37, 264 yards, 5 TD, 3 INT

Rushing

- Philadelphia – Donovan Morgan: 1 att, 2 yards, 1 TD
- Pittsburgh – Joshua Rue: 3 att, 8 yards, 2 TD

Receiving

- Philadelphia – Donovan Morgan: 14 rec, 189 yards, 5 TD
- Pittsburgh – Michael Washington: 9 rec, 111 yards, 1 TD

=== Week 2: vs. Iowa Barnstormers ===
Week 2: Iowa Barnstormers at Pittsburgh Power – Game summary

Quarter	1	2	3	4	Total
Barnstormers	7	7	7	7	28
Power	14	14	13	17	58

at Consol Energy Center, Pittsburgh, Pennsylvania

- Date: March 19
- Game time: 7:30 p.m. EDT
- Game attendance: 9,190
- Referee: Jim Corpora
- Recap

Game information

1st quarter

- Pittsburgh – (7:53) Joshua Rue 1-yard run (Paul Edinger kick), Pittsburgh 7–0
- Iowa – (5:06) Todd Blythe 34-yard pass from Brad Banks (Piotr Czech kick), Tied 7–7
- Pittsburgh – (2:18) Irving Campbell 24-yard pass from Bernard Morris (Paul Edinger kick), Pittsburgh 14–7

2nd quarter

- Iowa – (13:05) Todd Blythe 5-yard pass from Brad Banks (Piotr Czech kick), Tied 14–14
- Pittsburgh – (4:55) Joshua Rue 1-yard run (Paul Edinger kick), Pittsburgh 21–14
- Pittsburgh – (0:55) Lonnell Dewalt 21-yard pass from Bernard Morris (Paul Edinger kick), Pittsburgh 28–14

3rd quarter

- Iowa – (11:51) Todd Blythe 8-yard pass from Brad Banks (Piotr Czech kick), Pittsburgh 28–21
- Pittsburgh – (10:26) Jerome Mathis 37-yard pass from Kevin McCabe (Paul Edinger kick), Pittsburgh 35–21
- Pittsburgh – (0:39) Joshua Rue 3-yard pass from Kevin McCabe (Paul Edinger kick failed), Pittsburgh 41–21

4th quarter

- Pittsburgh – (4:55) Michael Washington 19-yard pass from Kevin McCabe (Paul Edinger kick), Pittsburgh 48–21
- Iowa – (1:59) Todd Blythe 10-yard pass from Brad Banks (Piotr Czech kick), Pittsburgh 48–28
- Pittsburgh – (0:41) Paul Edinger 32-yard field goal, Pittsburgh 51–28
- Pittsburgh – (0:24) Lonnell Dewalt 24-yard interception return (Paul Edinger kick), Pittsburgh 58–28

Passing

- Iowa – Justin Allgood: 27/45, 283 yards, 4 TD, 3 INT
- Pittsburgh – Kevin McCabe: 10/14, 210 yards, 3 TD

Rushing

- Iowa – Brad Banks: 2 att, 25 yards
- Pittsburgh – Joshua Rue: 6 att, 8 yards, 2 TD

Receiving

- Iowa – Todd Blythe: 9 rec, 131 yards, 4 TD
- Pittsburgh – Jerome Mathis: 4 rec, 53 yards, 1 TD

=== Week 3: at Milwaukee Mustangs ===
Week 3: Pittsburgh Power at Milwaukee Mustangs – Game summary

Quarter	1	2	3	4	Total
Power	21	14	14	0	49
Mustangs	7	13	13	14	47

at Bradley Center, Milwaukee, Wisconsin

- Date: March 28
- Game time: 7:30 p.m. EDT
- Game attendance: 3,283
- Recap

Game information

1st quarter

- Pittsburgh – (13:33) Jerome Mathis 12-yard pass from MCCABE, Kevin McCabe (Paul Edinger kick), Pittsburgh 7–0
- Pittsburgh – (12:06) Joshua Rue 3-yard run (Paul Edinger kick), Pittsburgh 14–0
- Pittsburgh – (7:09) Nick Zeck 21-yard pass from Kevin McCabe (Paul Edinger kick), Pittsburgh 21–0
- Milwaukee – (4:29) Dwayne Eley Jr. 21-yard pass from Eric Ward (Garrett Lindholm kick), Pittsburgh 21–7

2nd quarter

- Pittsburgh – (14:22) Eddie Thompson 3-yard run (Paul Edinger kick), Pittsburgh 28–7
- Milwaukee – (10:39) Eric Ward 17-yard run (Garrett Lindholm kick failed), Pittsburgh 28–13
- Milwaukee – (0:55) Antoine Burns 7-yard pass from Eric Ward (Garrett Lindholm kick), Pittsburgh 28–20
- Pittsburgh – Eddie Thompson 11-yard pass from Kevin McCabe (Paul Edinger kick), Pittsburgh 35–20

3rd quarter

- Milwaukee – (11:25) Damian Harrell 17-yard pass from R.J. Archer (Garrett Lindholm kick failed), Pittsburgh 35–26
- Pittsburgh – (8:20) Joshua Rue 4-yard run (Paul Edinger kick), Pittsburgh 42–26
- Pittsburgh – (4:17) Lonnell Dewalt 27-yard pass from Kevin McCabe (Paul Edinger kick), Pittsburgh 49–26
- Milwaukee – (0:14) Antoine Burns 16-yard pass from R.J. Archer (Garrett Lindholm kick), Pittsburgh 49–33

4th quarter

- Milwaukee – (8:06) Jason Onyebuagu 1-yard run (R.J. Archer pass), Pittsburgh 49–41
- Milwaukee – (0:50) Andre Jones 54-yard interception return (R.J. Archer rush failed), Pittsburgh 49–47

Passing

- Pittsburgh – Kevin McCabe: 16/29, 182 yards, 4 TD, 3 INT
- Milwaukee – R.J. Archer: 12/21, 113 yards, 2 TD, 1 INT

Rushing

- Pittsburgh – Joshua Rue: 6 att, 28 yards, 2 TD
- Milwaukee – Eric Ward: 3 att, 31 yards, 1 TD

Receiving

- Pittsburgh – Jerome Mathis: 3 rec, 63 yards, 1 TD
- Milwaukee – Antoine Burns: 9 rec, 83 yards, 2 TD

=== Week 4: vs. Tulsa Talons ===
Week 4: Tulsa Talons at Pittsburgh Power – Game summary

Quarter	1	2	3	4	Total
Talons	7	7	10	21	45
Power	0	14	0	8	22

at Consol Energy Center, Pittsburgh, Pennsylvania

- Date: April 2
- Game time: 7:30 p.m. EDT
- Game attendance: 9,925
- Recap

Game information

1st quarter

- Tulsa – (5:33) Bobby Reid 1-yard run (Juan Bongarra kick), Tulsa 7–0

2nd quarter

- Tulsa – (14:55) Matt Bassuener 6-yard run (Juan Bongarra kick), Tulsa 14–0
- Pittsburgh – (12:19) Josh Rue 14-yard pass from Kevin McCabe (Paul Edinger kick), Tulsa 14–7
- Pittsburgh – (1:49) Michael Washington 5-yard pass from Kevin McCabe (Paul Edinger kick), Tied 14–14

3rd quarter

- Tulsa – (6:36) Juan Bongarra 21-yard field goal, Tulsa 17–14
- Tulsa – (5:26) Troy McBroom 9-yard pass from Matt Bassuener (Juan Bongarra kick), Tulsa 24–14

4th quarter

- Tulsa – (9:17) Troy McBroom 9-yard pass from Matt Bassuener (Juan Bongarra kick), Tulsa 31–14
- Tulsa – (7:52) Bobby Reid 2-yard run (Juan Bongarra kick), Tulsa 38–14
- Pittsburgh – (4:11) Michael Washington 22-yard pass from Anthony Morelli (Anthony Morelli run), Tulsa 38–22
- Tulsa – (1:32) J.C. Neal 11-yard pass from Matt Bassuener (Juan Bongarra kick), Tulsa 45–22

Passing

- Tulsa – Matt Bassuener: 22/36, 199 yards, 3 TD
- Pittsburgh – Anthony Morelli: 11/17, 114 yards, 1 TD, 1 INT

Rushing

- Tulsa – Matt Bassuener: 11 att, 53 yards, 1 TD
- Pittsburgh – Kevin McCabe: 1 att, 14 yards

Receiving

- Tulsa – Troy McBroom: 7 rec, 81 yards, 2 TD
- Pittsburgh – Michael Washington: 6 rec, 58 yards, 2 TD

=== Week 6: vs. Jacksonville Sharks ===
Week 6: Jacksonville Sharks at Pittsburgh Power – Game summary

Quarter	1	2	3	4	Total
Sharks	14	24	13	14	65
Power	14	7	13	6	40

at Consol Energy Center, Pittsburgh, Pennsylvania

- Date: April 16
- Game time: 7:30 p.m. EDT
- Game attendance: 9,773
- Referee: Tony Cannella
- Recap

Game information

1st quarter

- Jacksonville – (8:54) Kirby Griffin 4-yard run (Marco Capozzoli kick), Jacksonville 7–0
- Pittsburgh – (5:31) Xavier Lee 8-yard pass from Anthony Morelli (Paul Edinger kick), Tied 7–7
- Jacksonville – (1:10) Sale' Key 9-yard pass from Aaron Garcia (Marco Capozzoli kick), Jacksonville 14–7
- Pittsburgh – (0:04) Lonnell Dewalt 45-yard pass from Anthony Morelli (Paul Edinger kick), Tied 14–14

2nd quarter

- Jacksonville – (12:34) Jamarko Simmons 2-yard run (Marco Capozzoli kick), Jacksonville 21–14
- Pittsburgh – (9:36) Joshua Rue 1-yard run (Paul Edinger kick), Tied 21–21
- Jacksonville – (6:12) Isaac Morales 9-yard pass from Aaron Garcia (Marco Capozzoli kick), Jacksonville 28–21
- Jacksonville – (1:14) Jamarko Simmons 1-yard run (Marco Capozzoli kick), Jacksonville 35–21
- Jacksonville – (0:00) Marco Capozzoli 24-yard field goal, Jacksonville 38–21

3rd quarter

- Pittsburgh – (13:14) Jason Willis 42-yard pass from Anthony Morelli (Paul Edinger kick), Jacksonville 38–28
- Jacksonville – (10:44) Jomo Wilson 7-yard pass from Aaron Garcia (Marco Capozzoli kick), Jacksonville 45–28
- Pittsburgh – (8:54) Michael Washington 23-yard pass from Anthony Morelli (Paul Edinger kick failed), Jacksonville 45–34
- Jacksonville – (2:04) Jomo Wilson 12-yard pass from Aaron Garcia (Marco Capozzoli kick failed), Jacksonville 51–34

4th quarter

- Jacksonville – (10:58) Kirby Griffin 6-yard run (Marco Capozzoli kick), Jacksonville 58–34
- Pittsburgh – (5:51) Lonnell Dewalt 18-yard pass from Anthony Morelli (Paul Edinger kick failed), Jacksonville 58–40
- Jacksonville – (3:47) Jeron Harvey 6-yard pass from Aaron Garcia (Marco Capozzoli kick), Jacksonville 65–40

Passing

- Jacksonville – Aaron Garcia: 31/44, 297 yards, 5 TD
- Pittsburgh – Anthony Morelli: 20/36, 290 yards, 5 TD

Rushing

- Jacksonville – Kirby Griffin: 6 att, 26 yards, 2 TD
- Pittsburgh – Anthony Morelli: 1 att, 28 yards

Receiving

- Jacksonville – Sale' Key: 11 rec, 116 yards, 1 TD
- Pittsburgh – Jason Willis: 8 rec, 100 yards, 1 TD

=== Week 7: at New Orleans VooDoo ===
Week 7: Pittsburgh Power at New Orleans VooDoo – Game summary

Quarter	1	2	3	4	Total
Power	0	14	14	28	56
VooDoo	7	7	7	28	49

at New Orleans Arena, New Orleans, Louisiana

- Date: April 21
- Game time: 8:05 p.m. EDT
- Game attendance: 6,937
- Referee: Scott Vaughn
- Recap

Game information

1st quarter

- New Orleans – (0:00) James Jordan 5-yard pass from Danny Wimprine (Jonathan Ruffin kick), New Orleans 7–0

2nd quarter

- New Orleans – (3:12) P.J. Berry 26-yard pass from Danny Wimprine (Jonathan Ruffin kick), New Orleans 14–0
- Pittsburgh – (1:00) Jason Willis 12-yard pass from Anthony Morelli (Paul Edinger kick), New Orleans 14–7
- Pittsburgh – (0:45) Jason Willis 11-yard pass from Anthony Morelli (Paul Edinger kick), Tied 14–14

3rd quarter

- Pittsburgh – (12:29) Lonnell Dewalt 17-yard pass from Anthony Morelli (Paul Edinger kick), Pittsburgh 21–14
- New Orleans – (10:05) James Jordan 33-yard pass from Danny Wimprine (Jonathan Ruffin kick), Tied 21–21
- Pittsburgh – (6:00) Xavier Lee 11-yard pass from Anthony Morelli (Paul Edinger kick), Pittsburgh 28–21

4th quarter

- Pittsburgh – (13:30) Anthony Morelli 1-yard run (Paul Edinger kick), Pittsburgh 35–21
- New Orleans – (12:51) P.J. Berry 58-yard kickoff return (Jonathan Ruffin kick), Pittsburgh 35–28
- Pittsburgh – (9:01) Michael Washington 31-yard pass from Anthony Morelli (Paul Edinger kick), Pittsburgh 42–28
- New Orleans – (7:53) James Jordan 14-yard pass from Danny Wimprine (Jonathan Ruffin kick), Pittsburgh 42–35
- Pittsburgh – (5:23) Lonnell Dewalt 8-yard pass from Anthony Morelli (Paul Edinger kick), Pittsburgh 49–35
- New Orleans – (3:35) Chris Wilson 31-yard pass from Danny Wimprine (Jonathan Ruffin kick), Pittsburgh 49–42
- Pittsburgh – (2:28) Xavier Lee 4-yard run (Paul Edinger kick), Pittsburgh 56–42
- New Orleans – (0:22) P.J. Berry 3-yard pass from Danny Wimprine (Jonathan Ruffin kick), Pittsburgh 56–49

Passing

- Pittsburgh – Anthony Morelli: 23/35, 232 yards, 6 TD
- New Orleans – Danny Wimprine: 25/40, 279 yards, 6 TD

Rushing

- Pittsburgh – Anthony Morelli: 7 att, 45 yards, 1 TD
- New Orleans – Tom Taggart: 3 att, 18 yards

Receiving

- Pittsburgh – Jason Willis: 8 rec, 87 yards, 2 TD
- New Orleans – James Jordan: 5 rec, 76 yards, 3 TD

=== Week 8: at Georgia Force ===
Week 8: Pittsburgh Power at Georgia Force – Game summary

Quarter	1	2	3	4	Total
Power	13	6	0	20	39
Force	13	7	21	17	58

at Arena at Gwinnett Center, Duluth, Georgia

- Date: April 30
- Game time: 7:30 p.m. EDT
- Game attendance: 2,093
- Referee: Joe Pester
- Recap

Game information

1st quarter

- Pittsburgh – (11:32) Xavier Lee 6-yard pass from Anthony Morelli (Paul Edinger kick), Pittsburgh 7–0
- Georgia – (10:31) C.J. Johnson 45-yard pass from Brett Elliot (Carlos Martinez kick), Tied 7–7
- Pittsburgh – (7:09) Jason Willis 4-yard pass from Anthony Morelli (Paul Edinger kick failed), Pittsburgh 13–7
- Georgia – (0:44) Maurice Purify 4-yard pass from Brett Elliot (Carlos Martinez kick failed), Tied 13–13

2nd quarter

- Georgia – (11:40) C.J. Johnson 13-yard pass from Brett Elliot (Carlos Martinez kick), Georgia 20–13
- Pittsburgh – (0:55) Joshua Rue 6-yard run (Paul Edinger kick failed), Georgia 20–19

3rd quarter

- Georgia – (13:14) Larry Shipp 15-yard pass from Brett Elliot (Carlos Martinez kick), Georgia 27–19
- Georgia – (6:09) Maurice Purify 4-yard pass from Brett Elliot (Carlos Martinez kick), Georgia 34–19
- Georgia – (0:25) Maurice Purify 6-yard pass from Brett Elliot (Carlos Martinez kick), Georgia 41–19

4th quarter

- Pittsburgh – (12:20) Xavier Lee 1-yard run (Paul Edinger kick), Georgia 41–26
- Georgia – (11:17) Maurice Purify 17-yard pass from Brett Elliot (Carlos Martinez kick), Georgia 48–26
- Pittsburgh – (7:40) Xavier Lee 2-yard run (Paul Edinger kick), Georgia 48–33
- Georgia – (4:19) Carlos Martinez 33-yard field goal, Georgia 51–33
- Georgia – (0:34) C.J. Johnson 44-yard pass from Brett Elliot (Carlos Martinez kick), Georgia 58–33
- Pittsburgh – (0:15) Craig Fulton 6-yard pass from Xavier Lee (Xavier Lee pass failed), Georgia 58–39

Passing

- Pittsburgh – Anthony Morelli: 22/41, 188 yards, 2 TD, 3 INT
- Georgia – Brett Elliott: 20/34, 261 yards, 8 TD, 1 INT

Rushing

- Pittsburgh – Joshua Rue: 9 att, 34 yards, 1 TD
- Georgia – Ben McDowell: 2 att, 2 yards

Receiving

- Pittsburgh – Jason Willis: 8 rec, 79 yards, 1 TD
- Georgia – C.J. Johnson: 8 rec, 140 yards, 3 TD

=== Week 9: vs. Spokane Shock ===
Week 9: Spokane Shock at Pittsburgh Power – Game summary

Quarter	1	2	3	4	Total
Shock	13	14	7	7	41
Power	14	0	20	17	51

at Consol Energy Center, Pittsburgh, Pennsylvania

- Date: May 7
- Game time: 8:00 p.m. EDT
- Game attendance: 6,756
- Referee: Perry Havener
- Recap

Game information

1st quarter

- Spokane – (14:46) Terrance Sanders 57-yard kickoff return (Taylor Rowan kick failed), Spokane 6–0
- Pittsburgh – (12:24) Bernard Morris 31-yard run (Paul Edinger kick), Pittsburgh 7–6
- Spokane – (8:52) Raul Vijil 8-yard pass from Kyle Rowley (Taylor Rowan kick), Spokane 13–7
- Pittsburgh – (2:53) Jason Willis 5-yard pass from Bernard Morris (Paul Edinger kick), Pittsburgh 14–13

2nd quarter

- Spokane – (7:40) Greg Orton 1-yard pass from Kyle Rowley (Taylor Rowan kick), Spokane 20–14
- Spokane – (0:10) Shaun Kauleinamoku 11-yard pass from Kyle Rowley (Taylor Rowan kick), Spokane 27–14

3rd quarter

- Pittsburgh – (13:55) Bernard Morris 5-yard run (Paul Edinger kick), Spokane 27–21
- Spokane – (9:29) Raul Vijil 10-yard pass from Kyle Rowley (Taylor Rowan kick), Spokane 34–21
- Pittsburgh – (8:06) Michael Washington 31-yard pass from Bernard Morris (Paul Edinger kick blocked), Spokane 34–27
- Pittsburgh – (1:33) Michael Washington 34-yard pass from Bernard Morris (Paul Edinger kick), Tied 34–34

4th quarter

- Pittsburgh – (8:48) D.J. Hall 7-yard pass from Bernard Morris (Paul Edinger kick), Pittsburgh 41–34
- Spokane – (4:26) Clay Harrell 1-yard run (Taylor Rowan kick), Tied 41–41
- Pittsburgh – (0:50) Jason Willis 6-yard pass from Bernard Morris (Paul Edinger kick), Pittsburgh 48–41
- Pittsburgh – (0:17) Paul Edinger 45-yard field goal, Pittsburgh 51–41

Passing

- Spokane – Kyle Rowley: 19/44, 244 yards, 4 TD, 2 INT
- Pittsburgh – Bernard Morris: 18/33, 226 yards, 5 TD, 1 INT

Rushing

- Spokane – Clay Harrell: 3 att, 13 yards, 1 TD
- Pittsburgh – Bernard Morris: 8 att, 66 yards, 2 TD

Receiving

- Spokane – Raul Vijil: 5 rec, 61 yards, 2 TD
- Pittsburgh – Jason Willis: 7 rec, 87 yards, 2 TD

=== Week 10: vs. San Jose SaberCats ===
Week 10: San Jose SaberCats at Pittsburgh Power – Game summary

Quarter	1	2	3	4	Total
SaberCats	21	13	14	0	48
Power	14	19	7	14	54

at Consol Energy Center, Pittsburgh, Pennsylvania

- Date: May 14
- Game time: 7:30 p.m. EDT
- Game attendance: 7,333
- Referee: Tom McCabe
- Recap

Game information

1st quarter

- Pittsburgh – (11:18) Jason Willis 15-yard pass from Bernard Morris (Paul Edinger kick), Pittsburgh 7–0
- Pittsburgh – (7:20) Michael Washington 13-yard pass from Bernard Morris (Paul Edinger kick), Pittsburgh 14–0
- San Jose – (4:58) Ben Nelson 11-yard pass from Mark Grieb (Juan Gamboa kick), San Jose 14–7
- San Jose – (3:26) Chad Cook 5-yard run (Juan Gamboa kick), Tied 14–14
- San Jose – (1:00) James Roe 6-yard pass from Mark Grieb (Juan Gamboa kick), San Jose 21–14

2nd quarter

- Pittsburgh – (10:48) Jason Willis 14-yard pass from Bernard Morris (Paul Edinger kick failed), San Jose 21–20
- San Jose – (8:16) James Roe 15-yard pass from Mark Grieb (Juan Gamboa failed), San Jose 27–20
- Pittsburgh – (6:16) Michael Washington 22-yard pass from Bernard Morris (Paul Edinger kick failed), San Jose 27–26
- San Jose – (2:00) Chad Cook 2-yard run (Juan Gamboa kick), San Jose 34–26
- Pittsburgh – (0:55) Michael Washington 4-yard pass from Bernard Morris (Paul Edinger kick), San Jose 34–33

3rd quarter

- San Jose – (10:13) Chad Cook 3-yard run (Juan Gamboa kick), San Jose 41–33
- Pittsburgh – (6:24) Lonnell Dewalt 9-yard pass from Bernard Morris (Paul Edinger kick), San Jose 41–40
- San Jose – (1:46) Burl Toler 11-yard pass from Mark Grieb (Juan Gamboa kick), San Jose 48–40

4th quarter

- Pittsburgh – (2:30) Michael Washington 18-yard pass from Bernard Morris (Bernard Morris pass failed), San Jose 48–46
- Pittsburgh – (0:14) Jason Willis 31-yard pass from Bernard Morris (Bernard Morris pass), Pittsburgh 54–48

Passing

- San Jose – Mark Grieb: 27/41, 294 yards, 4 TD, 1 INT
- Pittsburgh – Bernard Morris: 24/39, 263 yards, 8 TD, 2 INT

Rushing

- San Jose – Chad Cook: 13 att, 63 yards, 3 TD
- Pittsburgh – Bernard Morris: 4 att, 29 yards

Receiving

- San Jose – Burl Toler: 8 rec, 77 yards, 1 TD
- Pittsburgh – Michael Washington: 12 rec, 120 yards, 4 TD

=== Week 12: at Dallas Vigilantes ===
Week 12: Pittsburgh Power at Dallas Vigilantes – Game summary

Quarter	1	2	3	4	Total
Power	13	14	14	35	76
Vigilantes	13	21	7	34	75

at American Airlines Center, Dallas, Texas

- Date: May 28
- Game time: 8:30 p.m. EDT
- Game attendance: 9,876
- Referee: Joe Pester
- Recap

Game information

1st quarter

- Pittsburgh – (11:27) Michael Washington 18-yard pass from Bernard Morris (Paul Edinger kick), Pittsburgh 7–0
- Dallas – (10:15) Anthony Jones 28-yard pass from Dan Raudabaugh (Remy Hamilton kick), Tied 7–7
- Pittsburgh – (5:28) Michael Washington 1-yard run (Paul Edinger kick failed), Pittsburgh 13–7
- Dallas – (2:13) DeAndrew Rubin 15-yard pass from Dan Raudabaugh (Remy Hamilton kick failed), Tied 13–13

2nd quarter

- Dallas – (10:54) Matt Fields 6-yard pass from Dan Raudabaugh (Remy Hamilton kick), Dallas 20–13
- Pittsburgh – (6:11) Michael Washington 14-yard pass from Bernard Morris (Paul Edinger kick), Tied 20–20
- Dallas – (4:34) Anthony Jones 30-yard pass from Dan Raudabaugh (Remy Hamilton kick), Dallas 27–20
- Dallas – (3:29) R.J. Jackson 0-yard net recovery (Remy Hamilton kick), Dallas 34–20
- Pittsburgh – (0:52) Bernard Morris 27-yard run (Paul Edinger kick), Dallas 34–27

3rd quarter

- Pittsburgh – (9:41) Michael Washington 39-yard pass from Bernard Morris (Paul Edinger kick), Tied 34–34
- Pittsburgh – (3:50) Lonnell Dewalt 2-yard pass from Bernard Morris (Paul Edinger kick), Pittsburgh 41–34
- Dallas – (1:24) Tony Washington 7-yard pass from Dan Raudabaugh (Remy Hamilton kick), Tied 41–41

4th quarter

- Pittsburgh – (10:17) Joshua Rue 1-yard run (Paul Edinger kick), Pittsburgh 48–41
- Dallas – (8:40) DeAndrew Rubin 37-yard pass from Dan Raudabaugh (Remy Hamilton kick), Tied 48–48
- Pittsburgh – (7:13) Michael Washington 45-yard pass from Bernard Morris (Paul Edinger kick), Pittsburgh 55–48
- Dallas – (4:56) Matt Fields 27-yard pass from Dan Raudabaugh (Remy Hamilton kick), Tied 55–55
- Pittsburgh – (3:11) Jason Willis 16-yard pass from Bernard Morris (Paul Edinger kick), Pittsburgh 62–55
- Dallas – (1:39) Anthony Jones 22-yard pass from Dan Raudabaugh (Remy Hamilton kick), Tied 62–62
- Pittsburgh – (0:50) D.J. Hall 9-yard pass from Bernard Morris (Paul Edinger kick), Pittsburgh 69–62
- Dallas – (0:41) Anthony Jones 40-yard pass from Dan Raudabaugh (Remy Hamilton kick), Tied 69–69
- Pittsburgh – (0:27) Joshua Rue 3-yard run (Paul Edinger kick), Pittsburgh 76–69
- Dallas – (0:10) DeAndrew Rubin 22-yard pass from Dan Raudabaugh (Dan Raudabaugh pass failed), Pittsburgh 76–75

Passing

- Pittsburgh – Bernard Morris: 25/40, 280 yards, 7 TD
- Georgia – Dan Raudabaugh: 28/36, 433 yards, 10 TD

Rushing

- Pittsburgh – Bernard Morris: 7 att, 41 yards, 1 TD
- Georgia – Derrick Ross: 3 att, 14 yards

Receiving

- Pittsburgh – Michael Washington: 12 rec, 184 yards, 4 TD
- Georgia – Anthony Jones: 10 rec, 221 yards, 4 TD

=== Week 13: vs. Cleveland Gladiators ===
Week 13: Cleveland Gladiators at Pittsburgh Power – Game summary

Quarter	1	2	3	4	Total
Gladiators	6	13	13	0	32
Power	7	14	14	0	35

at Consol Energy Center, Pittsburgh, Pennsylvania

- Date: June 4
- Game time: 7:30 p.m. EDT
- Game attendance: 9,066
- Referee: Larry Smith
- Recap

Game information

1st quarter

- Cleveland – (9:39) Robert Redd 4-yard pass from Kurt Rocco (Matt Denny kick failed), Cleveland 6–0
- Pittsburgh – (4:34) Joshua Rue 2-yard run (Paul Edinger kick), Pittsburgh 7–6

2nd quarter

- Pittsburgh – (10:36) Jason Willis 27-yard pass from Bernard Morris (Paul Edinger kick), Pittsburgh 14–6
- Cleveland – (4:35) Thyron Lewis 9-yard pass from Kurt Rocco (Matt Denny kick failed), Pittsburgh 14–12
- Pittsburgh – (2:48) Jason Willis 40-yard pass from Bernard Morris (Paul Edinger kick), Pittsburgh 21–12
- Cleveland – (0:38) Thyron Lewis 13-yard pass from Kurt Rocco (Matt Denny kick), Pittsburgh 21–19

3rd quarter

- Cleveland – (11:55) Robert Redd 8-yard pass from Kurt Rocco (Matt Denny kick failed), Cleveland 25–21
- Pittsburgh – (10:15) Mike Lucian 1-yard run (Paul Edinger kick), Pittsburgh 28–25
- Cleveland – (5:54) Kurt Rocco 2-yard run (Matt Denny kick), Cleveland 32–28
- Pittsburgh – (3:46) Lonnell Dewalt 18-yard pass from Bernard Morris (Paul Edinger kick), Pittsburgh 35–32

4th quarter

No scoring

Passing

- Cleveland – Kurt Rocco: 28/43, 261 yards, 4 TD, 1 INT
- Pittsburgh – Bernard Morris: 17/23, 210 yards, 3 TD

Rushing

- Cleveland – Kurt Rocco: 5 att, 12 yards, 1 TD
- Pittsburgh – Bernard Morris: 8 att, 64 yards

Receiving

- Cleveland – Thyron Lewis: 9 rec, 104 yards, 2 TD
- Pittsburgh – Jason Willis: 5 rec, 105 yards, 2 TD

=== Week 14: at Tampa Bay Storm ===
Week 14: Pittsburgh Power at Tampa Bay Storm – Game summary

Quarter	1	2	3	4	Total
Power	21	14	13	7	55
Storm	21	13	12	16	62

at St. Pete Times Forum, Tampa, Florida

- Date: June 11
- Game time: 7:30 p.m. EDT
- Game attendance: 11,756
- Referee: Alex Kemp
- Recap

Game information

1st quarter

- Pittsburgh – (12:56) Michael Washington 20-yard pass from Bernard Morris (Paul Edinger kick), Pittsburgh 7–0
- Tampa Bay – (10:42) Huey Whittaker 27-yard pass from Brian Zbydniewski (Kyle Chilton kick), Tied 7–7
- Pittsburgh – (7:56) Jerome Mathis 22-yard pass from Bernard Morris (Paul Edinger kick), Pittsburgh 14–7
- Tampa Bay – (6:01) Huey Whittaker 25-yard pass from Brian Zbydniewski (Kyle Chilton kick), Tied 14–14
- Pittsburgh – (5:06) Jerome Mathis 57-yard kickoff return (Paul Edinger kick), Pittsburgh 21–14
- Tampa Bay – (1:50) Hank Edwards 30-yard pass from Brian Zbydniewski (Kyle Chilton kick), Tied 21–21

2nd quarter

- Tampa Bay – (13:07) Amarri Jackson 27-yard pass from Brian Zbydniewski (Kyle Chilton kick), Tampa Bay 28–21
- Pittsburgh – (8:23) Michael Washington 25-yard pass from Bernard Morris (Paul Edinger kick), Tied 28–28
- Tampa Bay – (5:52) Terrence Royal 5-yard run (Kyle Chilton kick failed), Tampa Bay 34–28
- Pittsburgh – (0:31) Lonnell Dewalt 5-yard pass from Bernard Morris (Paul Edinger kick), Pittsburgh 35–34

3rd quarter

- Tampa Bay – (9:47) Huey Whittaker 11-yard pass from Brian Zbydniewski (Kyle Chilton kick blocked), Tampa Bay 40–35
- Pittsburgh – (8:31) Jerome Mathis 45-yard pass from Bernard Morris (Paul Edinger kick failed), Pittsburgh 41–40
- Tampa Bay – (3:16) Amarri Jackson 4-yard pass from Brian Zbydniewski (Kyle Chilton kick failed), Tampa Bay 46–41
- Pittsburgh – (1:03) Jerome Mathis 46-yard pass from Bernard Morris (Paul Edinger kick), Pittsburgh 48–46

4th quarter

- Tampa Bay – (13:33) Hank Edwards 19-yard pass from Brian Zbydniewski (Kyle Chilton kick failed), Tampa Bay 52–48
- Tampa Bay – (9:37) Kyle Chilton 19-yard field goal, Tampa Bay 55–48
- Tampa Bay – (5:11) Amarri Jackson 41-yard pass from Brian Zbydniewski (Kyle Chilton kick), Tampa Bay 62–48
- Pittsburgh – (0:27) Michael Washington 2-yard pass from Bernard Morris (Paul Edinger kick), Tampa Bay 62–55

Passing

- Pittsburgh – Bernard Morris: 29/46, 335 yards, 7 TD, 1 INT
- Tampa Bay – Brian Zbydniewski: 24/34, 372 yards, 8 TD, 1 INT

Rushing

- Pittsburgh – Bernard Morris: 2 att, 7 yards
- Tampa Bay – Terrance Royal: 2 att, 18 yards, 1 TD

Receiving

- Pittsburgh – Jerome Mathis: 12 rec, 195 yards, 3 TD
- Tampa Bay – Amari Jackson: 11 rec, 158 yards, 3 TD

=== Week 15: at Utah Blaze ===
Week 15: Pittsburgh Power at Utah Blaze – Game summary

Quarter	1	2	3	4	Total
Power	13	14	60	13	100
Blaze	21	20	19	21	81

at EnergySolutions Arena, Salt Lake City, Utah

- Date: June 18
- Game time: 9:00 p.m. EDT
- Game attendance: 9,096
- Referee: Tony Call
- Recap

Game information

1st quarter

- Utah – (12:53) Alvance Robinson 3-yard pass from Tommy Grady (Kyle Brotzman kick), Utah 7–0
- Pittsburgh – (10:34) Jerome Mathis 28-yard pass from Kevin McCabe (Paul Edinger kick failed), Utah 7–6
- Utah – (7:26) Alvance Robinson 7-yard pass from Tommy Grady (Kyle Brotzman kick), Utah 14–6
- Utah – (5:54) Brandon Taylor 5-yard fumble recovery (Kyle Brotzman kick), Utah 21–6
- Pittsburgh – (2:35) Irving Campbell 12-yard run (Paul Edinger kick), Utah 21–13

2nd quarter

- Utah – (13:47) Aaron Lesue 10-yard pass from Tommy Grady (Kyle Brotzman kick failed), Utah 27–13
- Pittsburgh – (8:33) Lonnell Dewalt 7-yard pass from Chris Wallace (Paul Edinger kick), Utah 27–20
- Utah – (4:18) Jason Boone 6-yard pass from Tommy Grady (Kyle Brotzman kick), Utah 34–20
- Pittsburgh – (1:42) Irving Campbell 6-yard pass from Chris Wallace (Paul Edinger kick), Utah 34–27
- Utah – (0:02) Aaron Lesue 1-yard pass from Tommy Grady (Kyle Brotzman kick), Utah 41–27

3rd quarter

- Utah – (13:48) Alvance Robinson 25-yard pass from Tommy Grady (Kyle Brotzman kick), Utah 48–27
- Utah – (12:30) Ernest Pierce 41-yard pass from Tommy Grady (Kyle Brotzman kick failed), Utah 54–27
- Utah – (7:21) Chris Bocage 9-yard pass from Tommy Grady (Kyle Brotzman kick failed), Utah 60–27

4th quarter

- Utah – (14:12) Aaron Lesue 10-yard pass from Tommy Grady (Kyle Brotzman kick), Utah 67–27
- Utah – (6:58) Aaron Lesue 6-yard pass from Tommy Grady (Kyle Brotzman kick), Utah 74–27
- Pittsburgh – (4:08) Jerome Mathis 8-yard pass from Chris Wallace (Chris Wallace pass failed), Utah 74–33
- Utah – (0:51) Aaron Lesue 12-yard pass from Tommy Grady (Kyle Brotzman kick), Utah 81–33
- Pittsburgh – (0:05) Jason Willis 5-yard pass from Chris Wallace (Paul Edinger kick), Utah 81–40

Passing

- Pittsburgh – Chris Wallace: 19/39, 196 yards, 4 TD
- Utah – Tommy Grady: 31/39, 313 yards, 10 TD

Rushing

- Pittsburgh – Irving Campbell: 1 att, 12 yards, 1 TD
- Utah – Ernest Pierce: 1 att, 8 yards

Receiving

- Pittsburgh – Jerome Mathis: 6 rec, 67 yards, 2 TD
- Utah – Aaron Lesue: 11 rec, 97 yards, 5 TD

=== Week 16: vs. Milwaukee Mustangs ===
Week 16: Milwaukee Mustangs at Pittsburgh Power – Game summary

Quarter	1	2	3	4	Total
Mustangs	3	14	7	14	38
Power	13	13	0	13	39

at Consol Energy Center, Pittsburgh, Pennsylvania

- Date: June 25
- Game time: 7:30 p.m. EDT
- Game attendance: 8,227
- Referee: Jim Corpora
- Recap

Game information

1st quarter

- Milwaukee – (8:23) Garrett Lindholm 17-yard field goal, Milwaukee 3–0
- Pittsburgh – (6:11) Lonnell Dewalt 21-yard pass from Chris Wallace (Paul Edinger kick), Pittsburgh 7–3
- Pittsburgh – (3:06) Bernard Lay 31-yard interception return (Paul Edinger kick failed), Pittsburgh 13–3

2nd quarter

- Milwaukee – (13:37) Antoine Burns 4-yard pass from Gino Guidugli (Garrett Lindholm kick), Pittsburgh 13–10
- Pittsburgh – (9:42) Michael Washington 27-yard pass from Chris Wallace (Paul Edinger kick), Pittsburgh 20–10
- Milwaukee – (6:15) Antoine Burns 19-yard pass from Gino Guidugli (Garrett Lindholm kick), Pittsburgh 20–17
- Pittsburgh – (2:59) Michael Washington 33-yard pass from Chris Wallace (Paul Edinger kick failed), Pittsburgh 26–17

3rd quarter

- Milwaukee – (12:54) Dwayne Eley Jr. 9-yard pass from Gino Guidugli (Garrett Lindholm kick), Pittsburgh 26–24

4th quarter

- Milwaukee – (12:45) Dwayne Eley Jr. 8-yard pass from Gino Guidugli (Garrett Lindholm kick), Milwaukee 31–26
- Milwaukee – (7:49) Dwayne Eley Jr. 33-yard pass from Gino Guidugli (Garrett Lindholm kick), Milwaukee 38–26
- Pittsburgh – (4:52) Irvin Campbell 12-yard pass from Chris Wallace (Paul Edinger kick failed), Milwaukee 38–32
- Pittsburgh – (0:00) Lonnell Dewalt 16-yard pass from Chris Wallace (Paul Edinger kick), Pittsburgh 39–38

Passing

- Milwaukee – Gino Guidugli: 21/34, 237 yards, 5 TD, 2 INT
- Pittsburgh – Chris Wallace: 19/33, 253 yards, 5 TD, 1 INT

Rushing

- Milwaukee – Gino Guidugli: 5 att, 9 yards
- Pittsburgh – Chris Wallace: 4 att, 13 yards

Receiving

- Milwaukee – Dwayne Eley Jr.: 11 rec, 144 yards, 3 TD
- Pittsburgh – Michael Washington: 5 rec, 72 yards, 2 TD

=== Week 17: at Orlando Predators ===
Week 17: Pittsburgh Power at Orlando Predators – Game summary

Quarter	1	2	3	4	Total
Power	19	21	7	7	54
Predators	14	13	28	7	62

at Amway Center, Orlando, Florida

- Date: July 1
- Game time: 8:00 p.m. EDT
- Game attendance: 15,726
- Referee: Perry Havener
- Recap

Game information

1st quarter

- Pittsburgh – (13:15) D.J. Hall 10-yard pass from Bernard Morris (Paul Edinger kick), Pittsburgh 7–0
- Pittsburgh – (8:06) Irvin Campbell 38-yard pass from Bernard Morris (Paul Edinger kick failed), Pittsburgh 13–0
- Orlando – (7:29) Josh Bush 54-yard kickoff return (Mark Lewis kick), Pittsburgh 13–7
- Pittsburgh – (5:33) Michael Washington 29-yard pass from Bernard Morris (Paul Edinger kick failed), Pittsburgh 19–7
- Orlando – (1:28) Collin Drafts 10-yard run (Mark Lewis kick), Pittsburgh 19–14

2nd quarter

- Pittsburgh – (10:14) Joshua Rue 1-yard run (Paul Edinger kick), Pittsburgh 26–14
- Pittsburgh – (6:28) D.J. Hall 1-yard pass from Bernard Morris (Paul Edinger kick), Pittsburgh 33–14
- Orlando – (1:59) Robert Quiroga 36-yard pass from Collin Drafts (Mark Lewis kick failed), Pittsburgh 33–20
- Pittsburgh – (0:56) D.J. Hall 11-yard pass from Bernard Morris (Paul Edinger kick), Pittsburgh 40–20
- Orlando – (0:20) T.T. Toliver 4-yard pass from Collin Drafts (Mark Lewis kick), Pittsburgh 40–27

3rd quarter

- Orlando – (10:27) T.T. Toliver 6-yard pass from Collin Drafts (Mark Lewis kick), Pittsburgh 40–34
- Orlando – (9:15) Chris Dubalt 1-yard net recovery (Mark Lewis kick), Orlando 41–40
- Orlando – (8:23) Chris Dubalt 3-yard net recovery (Mark Lewis kick), Orlando 48–40
- Pittsburgh – (3:12) Lonnell Dewalt 10-yard pass from Bernard Morris (Paul Edinger kick), Orlando 48–47
- Orlando – (0:08) Josh Bush 8-yard pass from Collin Drafts (Mark Lewis kick), Orlando 55–47

4th quarter

- Pittsburgh – (8:52) Lonnell Dewalt 11-yard pass from Bernard Morris (Paul Edinger kick), Orlando 55–54
- Orlando – (2:05) Robert Quiroga 7-yard pass from Collin Drafts (Mark Lewis kick), Orlando 62–44

Passing

- Pittsburgh – Bernard Morris: 18/31, 237 yards, 7 TD, 1 INT
- Orlando – Collin Drafts: 23/34, 264 yards, 5 TD, 1 INT

Rushing

- Pittsburgh – Bernard Morris: 5 att, 59 yards
- Orlando – Collin Drafts: 4 att, 26 yards, 1 TD

Receiving

- Pittsburgh – D.J. Hall: 8 rec, 81 yards, 3 TD
- Orlando – Robert Quiroga: 6 rec, 64 yards, 2 TD

=== Week 18: vs. Arizona Rattlers ===
Week 18: Arizona Rattlers at Pittsburgh Power – Game summary

Quarter	1	2	3	4	Total
Rattlers	21	13	13	21	68
Power	7	7	13	7	34

at Consol Energy Center, Pittsburgh, Pennsylvania

- Date: July 10
- Game time: 7:30 p.m. EDT
- Game attendance: 8,600
- Referee: Jim Corpora
- Recap

Game information

1st quarter

- Arizona – (10:51) Kerry Reed 7-yard pass from Nick Davila (Fabrizio Scaccia kick), Arizona 7–0
- Arizona – (8:51) Rod Windsor 2-yard pass from Nick Davila (Fabrizio Scaccia kick), Arizona 14–0
- Pittsburgh – (3:39) Michael Washington 17-yard pass from Bernard Morris (Paul Edinger kick), Arizona 14–7
- Arizona – (0:04) Rod Windsor 6-yard pass from Nick Davila (Fabrizio Scaccia kick), Arizona 21–7

2nd quarter

- Pittsburgh – (10:38) Michael Washington 17-yard pass from Bernard Morris (Paul Edinger kick), Arizona 21–14
- Arizona – (5:48) Chris Jackson 5-yard pass from Nick Davila (Fabrizio Scaccia kick), Arizona 28–14
- Arizona – (0:09) Kerry Reed 3-yard pass from Nick Davila (Fabrizio Scaccia kick failed), Arizona 34–14

3rd quarter

- Arizona – (13:02) Chris Jackson 30-yard pass from Nick Davila (Fabrizio Scaccia kick), Arizona 41–14
- Pittsburgh – (11:19) Lonnell Dewalt 6-yard pass from Bernard Morris (Paul Edinger kick failed), Arizona 41–20
- Arizona – (4:53) Kerry Reed 15-yard pass from Nick Davila (Fabrizio Scaccia kick failed), Arizona 47–20
- Pittsburgh – (3:58) Michael Washington 57-yard kickoff return (Paul Edinger kick), Arizona 47–27

4th quarter

- Arizona – (13:14) Jason Geathers 2-yard pass from Nick Davila (Fabrizio Scaccia kick), Arizona 54–27
- Arizona – (8:01) Jason Geathers 5-yard pass from Trevor Harris (Fabrizio Scaccia kick), Arizona 61–27
- Pittsburgh – (5:52) Michael Washington 14-yard pass from Bernard Morris (Paul Edinger kick), Arizona 61–34
- Arizona – (3:35) Kerry Reed 6-yard pass from Trevor Harris (Fabrizio Scaccia kick), Arizona 68–34

Passing

- Arizona – Nick Davila: 22/35, 214 yards, 8 TD
- Pittsburgh – Bernard Morris: 19/35, 181 yards, 4 TD, 1 INT

Rushing

- Arizona – Odie Armstrong: 7 att, 22 yards
- Pittsburgh – Michael Washington: 2 att, 14 yards

Receiving

- Arizona – Jason Geathers: 8 rec, 86 yards, 2 TD
- Pittsburgh – Michael Washington: 6 rec, 63 yards, 3 TD

=== Week 19: at Cleveland Gladiators ===
Week 19: Pittsburgh Power at Cleveland Gladiators – Game summary

Quarter	1	2	3	4	Total
Power	7	21	20	7	55
Gladiators	14	25	8	20	67

at Quicken Loans Arena, Cleveland, Ohio

- Date: July 15
- Game time: 8:00 p.m. EDT
- Game attendance: 8,139
- Referee: Alex Kemp
- Recap

Game information

1st quarter

- Cleveland – (12:47) Troy Bergeron 18-yard pass from Kurt Rocco (Matt Denny kick), Cleveland 7–0
- Pittsburgh – (8:11) Jason Willis 33-yard pass from Bernard Morris (Paul Edinger kick), Tied 7–7
- Cleveland – (2:09) Robert Redd 9-yard pass from Kurt Rocco (Matt Denny kick), Cleveland 14–7

2nd quarter

- Cleveland – (12:11) Troy Bergeron 13-yard pass from Kurt Rocco (Matt Denny kick), Cleveland 20–7
- Pittsburgh – (8:49) Bernard Morris 1-yard run (Paul Edinger kick), Cleveland 20–14
- Cleveland – (6:45) Robert Redd 22-yard pass from Kurt Rocco (Matt Denny kick blocked), Cleveland 26–14
- Cleveland – (5:19) Tim Cheatwood 0-yard fumble recovery (Kurt Rocco pass failed), Cleveland 32–14
- Pittsburgh – (1:45) Jason Willis 9-yard pass from Bernard Morris (Paul Edinger kick), Cleveland 32–21
- Cleveland – (0:39) Robert Redd 24-yard pass from Kurt Rocco (Matt Denny kick), Cleveland 39–21
- Pittsburgh – (0:05) Michael Washington 8-yard pass from Bernard Morris (Paul Edinger kick), Cleveland 39–28

3rd quarter

- Pittsburgh – (10:28) Irvin Campbell 5-yard pass from Bernard Morris (Paul Edinger kick), Cleveland 39–35
- Pittsburgh – (6:02) Lonnell Dewalt 13-yard pass from Bernard Morris (Paul Edinger kick failed), Pittsburgh 41–39
- Cleveland – (2:52) Clifford Louis 5-yard pass from Kurt Rocco (Kurt Rocco pass), Cleveland 47–41
- Pittsburgh – (0:12) Jason Willis 22-yard pass from Bernard Morris (Paul Edinger kick), Pittsburgh 48–47

4th quarter

- Cleveland – (10:52) Dominick Goodman 18-yard pass from Kurt Rocco (Matt Denny kick), Cleveland 54–48
- Cleveland – (8:27) Russell Monk 2-yard run (Kurt Rocco pass failed), Cleveland 60–48
- Cleveland – (4:00) Dominick Goodman 16-yard pass from Kurt Rocco (Matt Denny kick), Cleveland 67–48
- Pittsburgh – (0:41) Lonnell Dewalt 3-yard pass from Bernard Morris (Paul Edinger kick), Cleveland 67–55

Passing

- Pittsburgh – Bernard Morris: 28/41, 318 yards, 7 TD
- Cleveland – Kurt Rocco: 25/35, 297 yards, 8 TD

Rushing

- Pittsburgh – Bernard Morris: 8 att, 23 yards, 1 TD
- Cleveland – Carlos Downey: 2 att, 6 yards

Receiving

- Pittsburgh – Jason Willis: 9 rec, 134 yards, 3 TD
- Cleveland – Dominick Goodman: 12 rec, 130 yards, 2 TD

=== Week 20: at Philadelphia Soul ===
Week 20: Pittsburgh Power at Philadelphia Soul – Game summary

Quarter	1	2	3	4	Total
Power	7	20	13	21	61
Soul	14	7	7	20	48

at Wells Fargo Center, Philadelphia, Pennsylvania

- Date: July 22
- Game time: 7:05 p.m. EDT
- Game attendance: 16,429
- Referee: Scott Vaughn
- Recap

Game information

1st quarter

- Philadelphia – (9:05) Donovan Morgan 18-yard pass from Ryan Vena (Jon Striefsky kick), Philadelphia 7–0
- Pittsburgh – (4:17) Michael Washington 8-yard pass from Bill Stull (Paul Edinger kick), Tied 7–7
- Philadelphia – (1:39) Darnell Whitley 9-yard run (Jon Striefsky kick), Philadelphia 14–7

2nd quarter

- Pittsburgh – (12:16) Charleston Gray 4-yard run (Paul Edinger kick blocked), Philadelphia 14–13
- Philadelphia – (6:41) Syvelle Newton 0-yard fumble recovery (Jon Striefsky kick), Philadelphia 21–13
- Pittsburgh – (3:21) Lonnell DeWalt 9-yard pass from Bill Stull (Paul Edinger kick), Philadelphia 21–20
- Pittsburgh – (1:32) Eddie Thompson 2-yard run (Paul Edinger kick), Pittsburgh 27–21

3rd quarter

- Pittsburgh – (12:31) Michael Washington 28-yard pass from Bill Stull (Paul Edinger kick), Pittsburgh 34–21
- Philadelphia – (9:47) Syvelle Newton 3-yard run (Jon Striefsky kick), Pittsburgh 34–28
- Pittsburgh – (0:03) Michael Washington 10-yard pass from Bill Stull (Paul Edinger kick failed), Pittsburgh 40–28

4th quarter

- Philadelphia – (11:41) Darnell Whitley 2-yard run (Jon Striefsky kick), Pittsburgh 40–35
- Pittsburgh – (6:10) Bernard Morris 21-yard pass from Bill Stull (Paul Edinger kick), Pittsburgh 47–35
- Philadelphia – (2:25) Ty Nsekle 4-yard pass from Ryan Vena (Jon Striefsky kick), Pittsburgh 47–42
- Pittsburgh – (0:48) Michael Washington 8-yard pass from Bill Stull (Paul Edinger kick), Pittsburgh 54–42
- Philadelphia – (0:14) Larry Brackins 15-yard pass from Ryan Vena (Jon Striefsky kick failed), Pittsburgh 54–48
- Pittsburgh – (0:10) Jason Willis 9-yard kickoff return (Paul Edinger kick), Pittsburgh 61–48

Passing

- Pittsburgh – Bill Stull: 24/40, 260 yards, 6 TD
- Philadelphia – Ryan Vena: 19/34, 267 yards, 3 TD, 1 INT

Rushing

- Pittsburgh – Eddie Thompson: 1 att, 2 yards, 1 TD
- Philadelphia – Darnell Whitley: 3 att, 13 yards, 2 TD

Receiving

- Pittsburgh – Michael Washington: 11 rec, 155 yards, 4 TD
- Philadelphia – Donovan Morgan: 6 rec, 112 yards, 1 TD
