= Milwaukee Mustangs (2009–2012) =

Arena football team

Logo

General information
- Folded: 2012
- Headquartered: Milwaukee, Wisconsin
- Colors: Black, orange, chrome, white
- Mascot: Stang

Personnel
- Owner: Arena Football League
- Head coach: Bob Landsee

Team history
- Milwaukee Iron (2009–2010); Milwaukee Mustangs (2011–2012)

Home fields
- Bradley Center (2009–2012); U.S. Cellular Arena (2010 playoff game)

League / conference affiliations
- af2 (2009): American Conference (2009); Midwest Division (2009); Arena Football League (2010–2012): National Conference (2010); Midwest Division (2010); American Conference (2011–2012); Eastern Division (2011–2012)

Championships
- Division championships: 1: 2010

Playoff appearances (1)
- 2010

The Milwaukee Mustangs were a professional arena football team based in Milwaukee, Wisconsin. They were members of the Arena Football League (AFL), which they joined in 2010 during the league's restructuring. They played their home games at the Bradley Center in downtown Milwaukee.

The team began play in 2009 as the Milwaukee Iron, and competed in af2, the AFL's developmental league. They joined the AFL after the league's restructuring in 2010. On January 27, 2011, the team officially changed its name to the Mustangs, after an older team that had played in the AFL from 1994 to 2001. Their final head coach was Bob Landsee. The Mustangs were dormant for the 2013 season. In October 2013, the rights to the franchise were sold to Terry Emmert, who subsequently started the Portland Thunder in Portland, Oregon.

In 2018, the Milwaukee Mustangs' intellectual properties were acquired by Counterbalance Sports & Entertainment, LLC, ("CSE") the sports-entertainment division of Counterbalance Group Inc. Counterbalance Sports began using the Milwaukee Iron / [Second] Milwaukee Mustangs branding in 2021.

== History ==
=== Milwaukee Iron ===
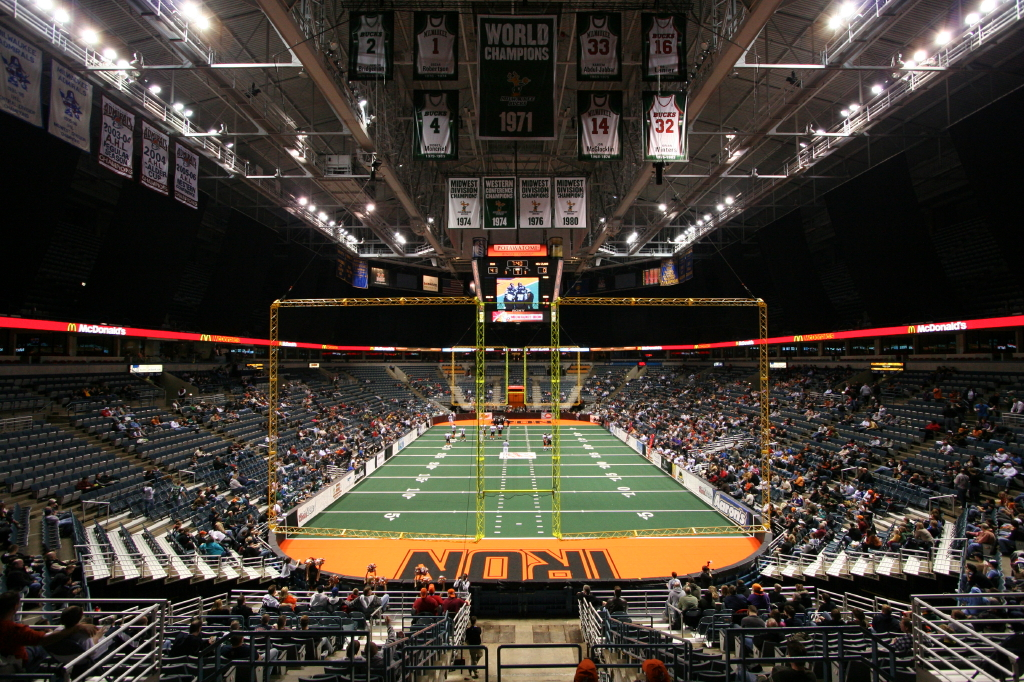
The Bradley Center setup for a game in 2009.

The Milwaukee Iron were announced as an af2 expansion team in March 2008 when the team's ownership group announced a three-year lease agreement to play at the Bradley Center beginning with the 2009 season. The announcement came the day before the Milwaukee Bonecrushers kicked off play in the Continental Indoor Football League at Milwaukee's US Cellular Arena.

Milwaukee had been without an arena football team since the Milwaukee Mustangs of the Arena Football League folded in 2001 after not being allowed to play at the Bradley Center.

The Iron played its first game on Thursday, March 12, 2009, a 60–0 exhibition shutout of the New Zealand Overstayers at the Bradley Center. They opened the regular season on Friday, March 27, 2009, when they played host to the Iowa Barnstormers. The Iron lost 60–38.

The Iron entered the Arena Football League in 2010. The team finished the year 11–5 and won the Midwest Division.

=== Milwaukee Mustangs ===
The team changed its name to the Mustangs on January 27, 2011. The name "Mustangs" was chosen as it was the name of the original franchise that existed from 1994 to 2001. The team's dancers were called the Fillies. The Mustangs were covered locally by WAUK (540 ESPN MILWAUKEE) and Time Warner Cable Sports 32.

On October 2, 2013, the AFL announced that an ownership group led by Portland businessman Terry W. Emmert has been approved by the AFL's board of directors to purchase a majority of the Milwaukee Mustangs and relocate the team to Portland, Oregon. The team began regular season play as the Portland Thunder in 2014 at the Moda Center (20,636), home of the NBA's Portland Trail Blazers.

== Season-by-season ==
| ArenaBowl champions | ArenaBowl appearance | Division champions | Playoff berth |

| Season | Team | League | Conference | Division | Regular season | | | Postseason results |
| Season | Team | League | Conference | Division | Finish | Wins | Losses | Postseason results |
|---|---|---|---|---|---|---|---|---|
Milwaukee Iron
| 2009 | 2009 | af2 | American | Midwest | 5th | 5 | 11 | |
| 2010 | 2010 | AFL | National | Midwest | 1st | 11 | 5 | Won Conference Semifinal (Chicago) 64–54; Lost Conference Championship (Spokane) 57–60 |
Milwaukee Mustangs
| 2011 | 2011 | AFL | American | East | 3rd | 7 | 11 | |
| 2012 | 2012 | AFL | American | East | 3rd | 5 | 13 | |
| Total | | | | | | 28 | 40 | (includes only regular season) |
| Total | | | | | | 1 | 1 | (includes only the postseason) |
| Total | | | | | | 29 | 41 | (includes both regular season and postseason) |

== Players of note ==
=== Retired uniform numbers ===
Milwaukee Mustangs retired numbers
| N° | Player | Position | Seasons | Ref. |
| 2 | Gary Compton | WR | 1994−2001 | |
| 5 | Todd Hammel | QB | 1994−99 | |
| 8 | Kenny Stucker | K | 1994−99 | |

=== Individual awards ===
AFL Offensive Player of the Year
| Season | Player | Position |
| 2010 | Chris Greisen | QB |

=== All-Arena players ===
The following Mustangs players were named to All-Arena Teams:

- QB Chris Greisen (1)
- WR Tiger Jones (1)
- DL Khreem Smith (1), Luis Vasquez (1)
- LB Marcus Everett (1)
- DB Andre Jones (1)

=== All-Ironman players ===
The following Mustangs players were named to All-Ironman Teams:

- WR/LB Marcus Everett (1)

== Head coaches ==
| Head coach | Tenure | Regular season record (W–L) | Post season record (W–L) | Notes |
|---|---|---|---|---|
| Gary Compton | 2009 | 5–11 | 0–0 | 2001 AFL Ironman of the Year; Also Director of Football Operations |
| Bob Landsee | 2010–2012 | 18–16 | 1–1 | All-Big Ten & All-American Offensive Lineman at the University of Wisconsin; Sixth round draft choice of the Philadelphia Eagles in 1986 |
