= Kenny Stucker =

American football player (born 1970)

No. 8, 6
- Position: Placekicker

Personal information
- Born: June 11, 1970 (age 56); Miami, Florida, U.S.
- Listed height: 5 ft 10 in (1.78 m)
- Listed weight: 185 lb (84 kg)

Career information
- College: Ball State (1988–1991)
- NFL draft: 1992: undrafted

Career history
- Milwaukee Mustangs (1994–1999); Chicago Rush (2002); New York Dragons (2003); Chicago Rush (2003); Tampa Bay Storm (2003)

Awards and highlights
- ArenaBowl champion (2003); 2× First-team All-Arena (1996, 1998); AFL Kicker of the Year (1998)

Career AFL statistics
- FG made: 121
- FG att: 262
- PAT made: 434
- PAT att: 476
- Tackles: 26.5
- Stats at ArenaFan.com

Kenny Stucker (born June 11, 1970) is an American former professional football placekicker who played seven seasons in the Arena Football League (AFL) with the Milwaukee Mustangs, Chicago Rush, New York Dragons and Tampa Bay Storm. He played college football at Ball State University.

== College career ==
Stucker played for the Ball State Cardinals from 1988 to 1991. He was named to the All-MAC First Team as a junior and senior after being named to the second team as a freshman and sophomore. He connected on 93-of-96 extra points and 62-of-87 field goals in his career. Stucker was selected to play in Blue-Gray College Football All-Star Game after his senior season. He was inducted into the Ball State Athletics Hall of Fame in 2009.

== Professional career ==
Stucker played for the Milwaukee Mustangs from 1994 to 1999. He was named First Team All-Arena in 1996 and 1998. He was also named AFL Kicker of the Year in 1998. Stucker was also the last player, as of 2014, in the Arena Football League to have connected on a two-point dropkick, which took place in 1997.

Stucker came out of retirement to sign with the Chicago Rush during the team'd playoff run in 2002.

Stucker played for the New York Dragons at the start of the 2003 Arena Football League season. He was released by the Dragons on March 8, 2003.

Stucker signed with the Chicago Rush on March 15, 2003. He was released by the Rush on March 28, 2003.

He spent time with the Tampa Bay Storm during the 2003 season.
