= Milwaukee Mustangs (1994–2001) =

Arena football team

Logo

General information
- Founded: 1994
- Folded: 2001
- Headquartered: Milwaukee, Wisconsin
- Colors: Deep purple, teal, white

Personnel
- Owner: Andrew Vallozzi
- Head coach: Rick Frazier

Team history
- Milwaukee Mustangs (1994–2001)

Home fields
- The Bradley Center (1994–2001)

League / conference affiliations
- Arena Football League (1994–2001): American Conference; Central Division

Playoff appearances (4)
- 1996, 1997, 1999 & 2000

The Milwaukee Mustangs were a professional arena football team based in Milwaukee, Wisconsin. The team was a member of the Arena Football League, playing from 1994 to 2001. The owner of the Mustangs was Andrew Vallozzi. The Mustangs played their home games at the Bradley Center in Milwaukee, Wisconsin.

== History ==
=== Expansion ===
The team was founded in August 1993, when Andrew Vallozzi was approved by the league for expansion. The city of Milwaukee became football hungry, after renovations to Lambeau Field led to speculation that the Green Bay Packers would soon stop playing games in Milwaukee, something they'd been doing since 1933. Later that year, the Packers would confirm the rumors and announced that their December 1994 contest at Milwaukee County Stadium would be their last.

For many in the Milwaukee area, the Mustangs helped fill the void left by the Packers. The team never finished lower than eighth in seasonal attendance, regularly drawing in the 14,000's and 15,000's (at a time when average attendance was approx. 8,500). The Mustangs even led the AFL in attendance in 1996.

=== Ending ===
After the 2001 season, the Mustangs lost their lease at the Bradley Center. When it was unable to find a replacement facility, the league folded the team. Milwaukee was left without an arena football team until 2008, with the formation of the Milwaukee Bonecrushers of the Continental Indoor Football League, who played their home games at the U.S. Cellular Arena. A year later, the Milwaukee Iron began play in the Arena Football 2 League across the street at the Bradley Center. In January 2011, it was announced that the Milwaukee Iron, now of the Arena Football League would be changing its name to the Milwaukee Mustangs.

In 2018, the Milwaukee Mustangs' intellectual properties were acquired by Counterbalance Sports & Entertainment, LLC, the sports-entertainment division of Counterbalance Group Inc. Additionally, Counterbalance Sports began using the Milwaukee Iron / [Second] Milwaukee Mustangs branding in 2021.

== Season-by-season ==
ArenaBowl champions	ArenaBowl appearance	Division champions	Playoff berth

Season	League	Conference	Division	Regular season			Postseason results
Season	League	Conference	Division	Finish	Wins	Losses	Postseason results
Milwaukee Mustangs
1994	AFL	American		6th	0	12	
1995	AFL	American	Central	4th	4	8	
1996	AFL	American	Central	2nd	10	4	Lost Quarterfinals (Albany) 70–58
1997	AFL	American	Central	2nd	8	6	Lost Quarterfinals (Arizona) 46–29
1998	AFL	American	Central	2nd	7	7	
1999	AFL	American	Central	3rd	7	7	Lost Quarterfinals (Iowa) 66–34
2000	AFL	American	Central	2nd	7	7	Lost Wild Card Round (Tampa Bay) 72–64
2001	AFL	American	Central	5th	3	11	
Total					46	62	(includes only regular season)
Total					0	4	(includes only the postseason)
Total					46	66	(includes both regular season and postseason)

== Players of note ==
=== Retired uniform numbers ===
Milwaukee Mustangs retired numbers
N°	Player	Position	Seasons	Ref.
2	Gary Compton	WR	1994–2001	
5	Todd Hammel	QB	1994–99	
8	Kenny Stucker	K	1994–99	

Note: These players' numbers were retired by the Milwaukee Iron in 2009.

=== Arena Football Hall of Famers ===
Milwaukee Mustangs Hall of Famers
No.	Name	Year Inducted	Position(s)	Years w/ Mustangs
1	Gary Mullen	1998	WR/DB	1995
??	Carl Aikens, Jr.	2000	WR/DB	1994

=== Individual awards ===
Kicker Player of the Year
Season	Player	Position
1998	Kenny Stucker	K

Don't Blink! Player of the Year
Season	Player	Position
2000	Lamart Cooper	OS

"Built Ford Tough" Man of the Year
Season	Player	Position
2001	Gary Compton	WR/LB

=== All-Arena players ===
The following Mustangs players were named to All-Arena Teams:

- WR/LB Gary Compton (2)
- WR/DB Sean Riley (1)
- OL/DL Ralph Jarvis (2), Ernest Allen (1)
- K Kenny Stucker (2), Steve Videtich (1)

=== All-Ironman players ===
The following Mustangs players were named to All-Ironman Teams:

- WR/DB Sean Riley (1)
- WR/LB Gary Compton (2)

=== All-Rookie players ===
The following Mustangs players were named to All-Rookie Teams:

- QB Kevin McDougal
- FB/LB Odell Parks
- OL/DL Mike Ivey

== Head coaches ==
Name	Term	Regular season				Playoffs		Awards
Name	Term	W	L	T	Win%	W	L	Awards
Lou Saban	1994	0	4	0	.000	0	0	
Art Haege	1994	0	8	0	.000	0	0	
Michael Trigg	1995–1997	22	18	0	.550	0	2	
Rick Frazier	1998–2001	24	32	0	.429	0	2	
