= Larry Brown =

Larry Brown may refer to:

== Arts and entertainment ==
- Larry Brown (musician) (born 1947), American musician, composer and recording engineer
- Larry Brown (writer) (1951–2004), American novelist, non-fiction and short story writer
- Larry Bubbles Brown (born 1952), American comedian and actor
- Larry Poncho Brown (born 1962), American artist

== Sports ==
=== American football ===
- Larry Brown (running back) (born 1947), NFL running back in the 1970s
- Larry Brown (tight end, born 1949), NFL tight end in the 1970s and 1980s
- Larry Brown (wide receiver) (born 1963), NFL wide receiver for the Minnesota Vikings
- Larry Brown (cornerback) (born 1969), NFL cornerback and Super Bowl MVP
- Larry Brown (tight end, born 1976), NFL tight end who played with the Tennessee Titans
- Larry Brown (defensive tackle) (born 1984), NFL defensive tackle

=== Other sports ===
- Larry Brown (catcher) (1901–1972), American baseball player in the Negro leagues
- Larry Brown (infielder) (1940–2024), American Major League Baseball infielder
- Larry Brown (basketball) (born 1940), American basketball coach and former player
- Larry Brown (ice hockey) (born 1947), Canadian former ice hockey player
- Larry Brown (sprinter) (born 1951), American former sprinter
- Larry Brown (runner) (1898–1993), American runner and investment banker

== Others ==
- Larry R. Brown (1943–2012), American politician
- Larry D. Brown, Kentucky politician

== See also ==
- Laurie Brown (disambiguation)
- Lawrence Brown (disambiguation)
