= Laurie Brown =

Laurie Brown may refer to:

- Laurie Brown (bishop) (1907–1993), British Anglican bishop; Bishop of Warrington and of Birmingham
- Laurie Brown (physicist) (1923–2019), American theoretical physicist
- Laurie Brown (footballer) (1937–1998), British footballer and manager
- Laurie Brown (broadcaster) (born 1957), Canadian television host
- Laurie Brown (photographer) (born 1978), American photographer
- Laurie Halsey Brown, American artist

== See also ==
- Lawrence Brown (disambiguation)
- Larry Brown (disambiguation)
