= 2011 Cleveland Gladiators season =

Arena Football League team season

- Head coach: Steve Thonn
- Home stadium: Quicken Loans Arena

Results
- Record: 10–8
- Division place: 1st AC East
- Playoffs: Lost Conference Semifinals (Force) 41–50

The 2011 Cleveland Gladiators season was the twelfth season for the franchise in the Arena Football League and the third while in Cleveland. The team was coached by Steve Thonn and played its home games at Quicken Loans Arena. The Gladiators finished the regular season 10–8 and qualified for the playoffs as the second seed in the American Conference. They lost to the Georgia Force in the conference semifinals, 41–50.

== Standings ==
East Division
Team	W	L	PCT	PF	PA	DIV	CON	Home	Away
y-Cleveland Gladiators	10	8	.556	904	842	4–2	6–5	7–2	3–6
Pittsburgh Power	9	9	.500	870	972	4–2	5–6	5–4	4–5
Milwaukee Mustangs	7	11	.389	872	867	1–5	3–8	4–5	3–6
Philadelphia Soul	6	12	.333	914	969	3–3	5–6	4–5	2–7

y - Clinched division

== Schedule ==
=== Regular season ===
The Gladiators had a bye week in Week 1 and opened the season on the road against the Spokane Shock on March 19. Their first home game of the season was played against the Chicago Rush on April 2. They hosted the Utah Blaze in their regular season finale.

Week	Day	Date	Kickoff	Opponent	Results		Location	Report
Week	Day	Date	Kickoff	Opponent	Score	Record	Location	Report
1	Bye							
2	Saturday	March 19	10:00 p.m. EDT	at Spokane Shock	W 61–55	1–0	Spokane Veterans Memorial Arena	
3	Sunday	March 27	7:30 p.m. EDT	at Tampa Bay Storm	W 66–26	2–0	St. Pete Times Forum	
4	Saturday	April 2	4:00 p.m. EDT	Chicago Rush	W 55–48	3–0	Quicken Loans Arena	
5	Bye							
6	Saturday	April 16	7:30 p.m. EDT	New Orleans VooDoo	L 33–34	3–1	Quicken Loans Arena	
7	Saturday	April 23	7:00 p.m. EDT	at Jacksonville Sharks	L 42–56	3–2	Jacksonville Veterans Memorial Arena	
8	Friday	April 29	7:30 p.m. EDT	Tulsa Talons	W 34–30	4–2	Quicken Loans Arena	
9	Friday	May 6	7:30 p.m. EDT	Milwaukee Mustangs	W 50–41	5–2	Quicken Loans Arena	
10	Saturday	May 14	7:30 p.m. EDT	at Orlando Predators	L 26–56	5–3	Amway Center	
11	Saturday	May 21	7:00 p.m. EDT	Philadelphia Soul	W 59–41	6–3	Quicken Loans Arena	
12	Saturday	May 28	10:00 p.m. EDT	at Arizona Rattlers	L 42–63	6–4	US Airways Center	
13	Saturday	June 4	7:30 p.m. EDT	at Pittsburgh Power	L 32–35	6–5	Consol Energy Center	
14	Saturday	June 11	7:00 p.m. EDT	Georgia Force	W 62–48	7–5	Quicken Loans Arena	
15	Sunday	June 19	2:00 p.m. EDT	at Kansas City Command	L 41–50	7–6	Sprint Center	
16	Saturday	June 25	7:00 p.m. EDT	San Jose SaberCats	W 82–21	8–6	Quicken Loans Arena	
17	Saturday	July 2	8:00 p.m. EDT	at Milwaukee Mustangs	W 62–58	9–6	Bradley Center	
18	Friday	July 8	8:00 p.m. EDT	at Philadelphia Soul	L 21–49	9–7	Wells Fargo Center	
19	Friday	July 15	8:00 p.m. EDT	Pittsburgh Power	W 67–55	10–7	Quicken Loans Arena	
20	Friday	July 22	7:30 p.m. EDT	Utah Blaze	L 69–76	10–8	Quicken Loans Arena	

=== Playoffs ===
Round	Day	Date	Kickoff	Opponent	Results	Location	Report
AC Semifinals	Sunday	July 31	3:00 p.m. EDT	Georgia Force	L 41–50	Quicken Loans Arena	

== Roster ==
2011 Cleveland Gladiators roster
Quarterbacks: 8 John Dutton; 14 Kurt Rocco; Fullbacks: 35 Carlos Downey; 10 Russ Monk; Wide receivers: 2 Troy Bergeron; 21 Dominick Goodman; 11 A. J. Kegg; 9 Thyron Lewis; 1 Robert Redd	Offensive linemen: 96 Colin Bryant; -- Nerraw McCormack; 74 Adam Tadisch; 93 Nate Tucker; 57 Mike Ward; Defensive linemen: 13 Anthony Hoke; -- Jock McKissic; 91 Prentice Purnell; 55 Conor Reilly	Linebackers: 49 Tim Cheatwood; Defensive backs: 23 Levy Brown; 3 Michael Bragg; 7 Davion Mitchell; 20 Joe Phinisee; Kickers: 12 Matt Denny	Injury reserve: 99 Drew Berube DL; 70 Joe Blanks OL; 51 William Eisenhardt OL; 15 Andrico Hines QB; 5 Quorey Payne WR; 77 Calvin Wilson OL; 50 Kyle Wilson LB; Other league exempt: 65 Cliff Louis OL; 15 Troy Weatherhead QB; Refused to report: -- Larry Brown DL; -- Rico Ochoa OL; League suspension: 79 Jeff Maddux OL; Inactive reserve: Currently vacant; Recallable reassignment: Currently vacant; Rookies in italics Roster Archived 2015-02-15 at the Wayback Machine updated July 29, 2011; 24 Active, 12 Inactive

== Regular season ==
=== Week 2: at Spokane Shock ===
Week 2: Cleveland Gladiators at Spokane Shock – Game summary

Quarter	1	2	3	4	Total
Gladiators	14	14	13	20	61
Shock	7	21	6	21	55

at Spokane Veterans Memorial Arena, Spokane, Washington

- Date: March 19
- Game time: 8:00 p.m. EDT
- Game attendance: 10,140
- Referee: Shane Anderson
- Recap

Game information

1st quarter

- Cleveland – (11:25) Troy Bergeron 14-yard pass from John Dutton (Matt Denny kick), Cleveland 7–0
- Spokane – (5:56) Kyle Rowley 1-yard run (Taylor Rownan kick), Tied 7–7
- Cleveland – (3:07) Troy Bergeron 15-yard pass from John Dutton (Matt Denny kick), Cleveland 14–7

2nd quarter

- Spokane – (14:10) Emery Sammons 3-yard pass from Kyle Rowley (Taylor Rownan kick), Tied 14–14
- Cleveland – (12:58) Victor Williams 45-yard pass from John Dutton (Matt Denny kick), Cleveland 21–14
- Spokane – (8:45) Markee White 11-yard pass from Kyle Rowley (Taylor Rownan kick), Tied 21–21
- Spokane – (3:10) Greg Orton 10-yard pass from Kyle Rowley (Taylor Rownan kick), Spokane 28–21
- Cleveland – (0:08) Robert Redd 8-yard pass from John Dutton (Matt Denny kick), Tied 28–28

3rd quarter

- Cleveland – (13:46) Robert Redd 18-yard pass from John Dutton (Matt Denny kick blocked), Cleveland 34–28
- Cleveland – (6:14) Troy Bergeron 33-yard pass from John Dutton (Matt Denny kick), Cleveland 41–28
- Spokane – (3:57) Greg Orton 10-yard pass from Kyle Rowley (Taylor Rownan kick failed), Cleveland 41–34

4th quarter

- Cleveland – (13:56) John Dutton 1-yard run (Matt Denny kick), Cleveland 48–34
- Cleveland – (6:35) Carlos Downey 5-yard run, Cleveland 54–34
- Spokane – (4:45) Markee White 2-yard pass from Kyle Rowley (Taylor Rownan kick), Cleveland 54–41
- Spokane – (2:13) Markee White 19-yard pass from Kyle Rowley (Taylor Rownan kick), Cleveland 54–48
- Cleveland – (0:57) Troy Bergeron 12-yard pass from Kurt Rocco (Matt Denny kick), Cleveland 61–48
- Spokane – (0:46) Emery Sammons 13-yard pass from Kyle Rowley (Taylor Rownan kick), Cleveland 61–55

Passing

- Cleveland – John Dutton: 20/30, 257 yards, 6 TD
- Spokane – Kyle Rowley: 29/45, 313 yards, 7 TD, 1 INT

Rushing

- Cleveland – Troy Bergeron: 2 att, 10 yards
- Spokane – Emery Sammons: 1 att, 4 yards

Receiving

- Cleveland – Troy Bergeron: 8 rec, 134 yards, 4 TD
- Spokane – Markee White: 10 rec, 103 yards, 3 TD

=== Week 3: at Tampa Bay Storm ===
Week 3: Cleveland Gladiators at Tampa Bay Storm – Game summary

Quarter	1	2	3	4	Total
Gladiators	22	10	13	21	66
Storm	0	13	6	7	26

at St. Pete Times Forum, Tampa, Florida

- Date: March 27
- Game time: 7:30 p.m. EDT
- Game attendance: 7,939
- Referee: Kevin Stine
- Recap

Game information

1st quarter

- Cleveland – (14:31) Team safety, Cleveland 2–0
- Cleveland – (13:01) Robert Redd 32-yard pass from Kurt Rocco (Matt Denny kick failed), Cleveland 8–0
- Cleveland – (7:37) Russell Monk 1-yard run (Matt Denny kick), Cleveland 15–0
- Cleveland – (4:00) Troy Bergeron 21-yard pass from Kurt Rocco (Matt Denny kick), Cleveland 22–0

2nd quarter

- Cleveland – (8:21) Matt Denny 22-yard field goal, Cleveland 25–0
- Tampa Bay – (8:09) Michael Lindsey 56-yard kickoff return (Kyle Chilton kick), Cleveland 25–7
- Cleveland – (0:44) Mike Bragg 32-yard interception return (Matt Denny kick), Cleveland 32–7
- Tampa Bay – (0:13) Hank Edwards 4-yard pass from Mike Potts (Kyle Chilton kick failed), Cleveland 32–13

3rd quarter

- Cleveland – (12:30) Troy Bergeron 21-yard pass from Kurt Rocco (Matt Denny kick), Cleveland 39–13
- Cleveland – (1:16) Victor Williams 25-yard pass from Kurt Rocco (Matt Denny kick failed), Cleveland 45–13
- Tampa Bay – (0:22) Michael Lindsey 58-yard kickoff return (Kyle Chilton kick failed), Cleveland 45–19

4th quarter

- Cleveland – (14:55) Troy Bergeron 6-yard pass from Kurt Rocco (Matt Denny kick), Cleveland 52–19
- Cleveland – (9:30) Robert Redd 43-yard pass from Kurt Rocco (Matt Denny kick), Cleveland 59–19
- Cleveland – (7:01) Kurt Rocco 1-yard run (Matt Denny kick), Cleveland 66–19
- Tampa Bay – (2:26) Huey Whittaker 13-yard pass from Grant Gregory (Kyle Chilton kick), Cleveland 66–26

Passing

- Cleveland – Kurt Rocco: 20/23, 270 yards, 6 TD
- Tampa Bay – Mike Potts: 16/30, 139 yards, 1 TD, 3 INT

Rushing

- Cleveland – Kurt Rocco: 6 att, 7 yards, 1 TD
- Tampa Bay – Grant Gregory: 2 att, 21 yards

Receiving

- Cleveland – Robert Redd: 7 rec, 112 yards, 2 TD
- Tampa Bay – Huey Whittaker: 10 rec, 103 yards, 1 TD

=== Week 4: vs. Chicago Rush ===
Week 4: Chicago Rush at Cleveland Gladiators – Game summary

Quarter	1	2	3	4	Total
Rush	7	12	14	15	48
Gladiators	7	21	14	13	55

at Quicken Loans Arena, Cleveland, Ohio

- Date: April 2
- Game time: 4:00 p.m. EDT
- Game attendance: 8,305
- Referee: Tom McCabe
- Recap

Game information

1st quarter

- Cleveland – (11:51) Troy Bergeron 23-yard pass from Kurt Rocco (Matt Denny kick), Cleveland 7–0
- Chicago – (1:48) Russ Michna 5-yard run (Chris Gould kick), Tied 7–7

2nd quarter

- Chicago – (14:53) Reggie Gray 8-yard pass from Russ Michna (Chris Gould rush failed), Chicago 13–7
- Cleveland – (10:12) Troy Bergeron 20-yard pass from Kurt Rocco (Matt Denny kick), Cleveland 14–13
- Chicago – (3:44) Micah Rucker 12-yard pass from Russ Michna (Chris Gould kick blocked), Chicago 19–14
- Cleveland – (1:35) Troy Bergeron 37-yard pass from Kurt Rocco (Matt Denny kick), Cleveland 21–19
- Cleveland – (0:16) Victor Williams 4-yard pass from Kurt Rocco (Matt Denny kick), Cleveland 28–19

3rd quarter

- Chicago – (9:26) Kelvin Morris 1-yard pass from Russ Michna (Chris Gould kick), Cleveland 28–26
- Cleveland – (5:55) Troy Bergeron 39-yard pass from Kurt Rocco (Matt Denny kick), Cleveland 35–26
- Chicago – (2:26) Johnie Kirton 4-yard run (Chris Gould kick), Cleveland 35–33
- Cleveland – (0:47) Troy Bergeron 5-yard pass from Kurt Rocco (Matt Denny kick), Cleveland 42–33

4th quarter

- Chicago – (11:38) Reggie Gray 14-yard pass from Russ Michna (Chris Gould kick failed), Cleveland 42–39
- Cleveland – (9:17) Troy Bergeron 4-yard pass from Kurt Rocco (Matt Denny kick), Cleveland 49–39
- Cleveland – (4:18) Robert Redd 21-yard pass from Kurt Rocco (Matt Denny kick blocked), Cleveland 55–39
- Chicago – (4:18) Jason Simpson PAT return, Cleveland 55–41
- Chicago – (0:58) Reggie Gray 7-yard pass from Russ Michna (Chris Gould kick), Cleveland 55–48

Passing

- Chicago – Russ Michna: 21/35, 235 yards, 5 TD, 3 INT
- Cleveland – Kurt Rocco: 21/37, 320 yards, 8 TD, 2 INT

Rushing

- Chicago – Johnie Kirton: 6 att, 31 yards, 1 TD
- Cleveland – Kurt Rocco: 1 att, 13 yards

Receiving

- Chicago – Reggie Gray: 11 rec, 144 yards, 3 TD
- Cleveland – Troy Bergeron: 10 rec, 187 yards, 6 TD

=== Week 6: vs. New Orleans VooDoo ===
Week 6: New Orleans VooDoo at Cleveland Gladiators – Game summary

Quarter	1	2	3	4	Total
VooDoo	14	6	7	7	34
Gladiators	6	20	7	0	33

at Quicken Loans Arena, Cleveland, Ohio

- Date: April 15
- Game time: 7:30 p.m. EDT
- Game attendance: 7,123
- Referee: Alex Kemp
- Recap

Game information

1st quarter

- New Orleans – (10:25) Tom Taggart 2-yard run (Jonathan Ruffin kick), New Orleans 7–0
- New Orleans – (8:44) Danny Wimprine 6-yard run (Jonathan Ruffin kick), New Orleans 14–0
- Cleveland – (6:13) Russell Monk 4-yard run (Matt Denny kick failed), New Orleans 14–6

2nd quarter

- Cleveland – (8:46) Russell Monk 1-yard run (Matt Denny kick), New Orleans 14–13
- Cleveland – (4:48) Troy Bergeron 8-yard pass from Kurt Rocco (Matt Denny kick), Cleveland 20–14
- New Orleans – (3:00) Chris Wilson 45-yard pass from Danny Wimprine (Jonathan Ruffin kick blocked), Tied 20–20
- Cleveland – (0:08) Russell Monk 2-yard run (Matt Denny kick failed), Cleveland 26–20

3rd quarter

- New Orleans – (11:20) Carlese Franklin 3-yard pass from Danny Wimprine (Jonathan Ruffin kick), New Orleans 27–26
- Cleveland – (9:46) Kurt Rocco 1-yard run (Matt Denny kick), Cleveland 33–27

4th quarter

- New Orleans – (4:03) James Jordan 8-yard pass from Danny Wimprine (Jonathan Ruffin kick), New Orleans 34–33

Passing

- New Orleans – Danny Wimprine: 22/36, 200 yards, 3 TD, 1 INT
- Cleveland – Kurt Rocco: 19/31, 217 yards, 1 TD, 2 INT

Rushing

- New Orleans – Danny Wimprine: 3 att, 15 yards, 1 TD
- Cleveland – Russell Monk: 4 rec, 8 yards, 3 TD

Receiving

- New Orleans – P.J. Berry: 10 rec, 79 yards
- Cleveland – Troy Bergeron: 11 rec, 117 yards, 1 TD

=== Week 7: at Jacksonville Sharks ===
Week 7: Cleveland Gladiators at Jacksonville Sharks – Game summary

Quarter	1	2	3	4	Total
Gladiators	7	22	13	0	42
Sharks	7	14	15	20	56

at Jacksonville Veterans Memorial Arena, Jacksonville, Florida

- Date: April 23
- Game time: 7:00 p.m. EDT
- Recap

Game information

1st quarter

- Cleveland – (9:12) Kurt Rocco 1-yard run (Matt Denny kick), Cleveland 7–0
- Jacksonville – (4:42) Kirby Griffin 2-yard run (Marco Capozzoli kick), Tied 7–7

2nd quarter

- Cleveland – (14:34) Kurt Rocco 1-yard run (Matt Denny kick), Cleveland 14–7
- Jacksonville – (10:20) Jeron Harvey 10-yard pass from Aaron Garcia (Marco Capozzoli kick), Tied 14–14
- Cleveland – (6:30) Robert Redd 49-yard pass from Kurt Rocco (Matt Denny kick), Cleveland 21–14
- Jacksonville – (3:41) Kirby Griffin 0-yard fumble recovery (Marco Capozzoli kick), Tied 21–21
- Cleveland – (0:19) Kurt Rocco 2-yard run (Matt Denny kick failed), Cleveland 27–21
- Cleveland – (0:16) Team safety, Cleveland 29–21

3rd quarter

- Jacksonville – (12:02) Jomo Wilson 28-yard pass from Aaron Garcia (Jeff Hughley rush), Tied 29–29
- Cleveland – (6:44) Robert Redd 14-yard pass from Kurt Rocco (Matt Denny kick), Cleveland 36–29
- Jacksonville – (2:56) Jeron Harvey 3-yard pass from Aaron Garcia (Marco Capozzoli kick), Tied 36–36
- Cleveland – (0:22) Troy Bergeron 28-yard pass from Kurt Rocco (Matt Denny kick failed), Cleveland 42–36

4th quarter

- Jacksonville – (11:37) Jeron Harvey 7-yard pass from Aaron Garcia (Marco Capozzoli kick failed), Tied 42–42
- Jacksonville – (3:35) Aaron Garcia 5-yard run (Marco Capozzoli kick), Jacksonville 49–42
- Jacksonville – (0:38) Jomo Wilson 22-yard pass from Aaron Garcia (Marco Capozzoli kick), Jacksonville 56–42

Passing

- Cleveland – Kurt Rocco: 25/37, 180 yards, 4 TD, 2 INT
- Jacksonville – Aaron Garcia: 24/33, 277 yards, 5 TD

Rushing

- Cleveland – Russell Monk: 2 att, 7 yards
- Jacksonville – Kirby Griffin: 5 rec, 18 yards, 1 TD

Receiving

- Cleveland – Dominick Goodman: 10 rec, 131 yards, 2 TD
- Jacksonville – Jomo Wilson: 8 rec, 108 yards, 2 TD

=== Week 8: vs. Tulsa Talons ===
Week 8: Tulsa Talons at Cleveland Gladiators – Game summary

Quarter	1	2	3	4	Total
Talons	7	16	7	0	30
Gladiators	14	7	0	13	34

at Quicken Loans Arena, Cleveland, Ohio

- Date: April 29
- Game time: 7:30 p.m. EDT
- Game attendance: 5,109
- Referee: Alex Kemp
- Recap

Game information

1st quarter

- Cleveland – (11:05) Robert Redd 2-yard pass from Kurt Rocco (Matt Denny kick), Cleveland 7–0
- Tulsa – (6:32) Matt Bassuener 2-yard run (Juan Bongarra kick), Tied 7–7
- Cleveland – (0:05) Troy Bergeron 4-yard pass from Kurt Rocco (Matt Denny kick), Cleveland 14–7

2nd quarter

- Tulsa – (12:43) Anthony Bolden 10-yard pass from Matt Bassuener (Juan Bongarra kick), Tied 14–14
- Cleveland – (8:56) Robert Redd 4-yard pass from Kurt Rocco (Matt Denny kick), Cleveland 21–14
- Tulsa – (5:53) Al Hunt 12-yard pass from Matt Bassuener (Juan Bongarra kick), Tied 21–21
- Tulsa – (4:37) Team safety, Tulsa 23–21

3rd quarter

- Tulsa – (7:27) Darrell Davis 4-yard pass from Matt Bassuener (Juan Bongarra kick), Tulsa 30–21

4th quarter

- Cleveland – (14:53) Robert Redd 7-yard pass from Dan Whalen (Matt Denny kick), Tulsa 30–28
- Cleveland – (0:33) Russell Monk 4-yard run (Matt Denny kick failed), Cleveland 34–30

Passing

- Tulsa – Matt Bassuener: 23/40, 246 yards, 3 TD, 1 INT
- Cleveland – Kurt Rocco: 12/21, 136 yards, 3 TD

Rushing

- Tulsa – Matt Bassuener: 3 att, 20 yards, 1 TD
- Cleveland – Dan Whalen: 4 att, 28 yards

Receiving

- Tulsa – Brandon Copeland: 8 rec, 101 yards
- Cleveland – Dominick Goodman: 7 rec, 91 yards

=== Week 9: vs. Milwaukee Mustangs ===
Week 9: Milwaukee Mustangs at Cleveland Gladiators – Game summary

Quarter	1	2	3	4	Total
Mustangs	7	13	7	14	41
Gladiators	20	3	7	20	50

at Quicken Loans Arena, Cleveland, Ohio

- Date: May 6
- Game time: 7:30 p.m. EDT
- Game attendance: 5,077
- Referee: Tom McCabe
- Recap

Game information

1st quarter

- Cleveland – (13:16) Robert Redd 28-yard pass from Kurt Rocco (Matt Denny kick), Cleveland 7–0
- Cleveland – (5:39) Carlos Downey 8-yard run (Matt Denny kick), Cleveland 14–0
- Milwaukee – (2:31) Damian Harrell 25-yard pass from R.J. Archer (Garrett Lindholm kick), Cleveland 14–7
- Cleveland – (2:00) Troy Bergeron 58-yard kickoff return (Matt Denny kick failed), Cleveland 20–7

2nd quarter

- Milwaukee – (12:48) Mykel Benson 1-yard run (Garrett Lindholm kick blocked), Cleveland 20–13
- Milwaukee – (5:26) Damian Harrell 19-yard pass from R.J. Archer (Garrett Lindholm kick), Tied 20–20
- Cleveland – (0:00) Matt Denny 18-yard field goal, Cleveland 23–20

3rd quarter

- Milwaukee – (10:50) Troy Bergeron 10-yard pass from Dan Whalen (Matt Denny kick), Milwaukee 27–23
- Cleveland – (1:01) Mykel Benson 1-yard run (Garrett Lindholm kick), Cleveland 30–27

4th quarter

- Cleveland – (9:34) Dan Whalen 1-yard run (Matt Denny kick), Cleveland 37–27
- Cleveland – (5:45) Troy Bergeron 3-yard pass from Dan Whalen (Matt Denny kick failed), Cleveland 43–27
- Milwaukee – (1:10) Brent Holmes 8-yard pass from R.J. Archer (R.J. Archer pass failed), Cleveland 43–33
- Cleveland – (0:47) Dan Whalen 8-yard run (Matt Denny kick), Cleveland 50–33
- Milwaukee – (0:32) Brent Holmes 5-yard pass from R.J. Archer (R.J. Archer pass), Cleveland 50–41

Passing

- Milwaukee – R.J. Archer: 22/31, 244 yards, 4 TD, 1 INT
- Cleveland – Kurt Rocco: 12/20, 146 yards, 1 TD

Rushing

- Milwaukee – Mykel Benson: 10 att, 34 yards, 2 TD
- Cleveland – Dan Whalen: 4 att, 17 yards, 2 TD

Receiving

- Milwaukee – Damian Harrell: 8 rec, 102 yards, 2 TD
- Cleveland – Troy Bergeron: 7 rec, 81 yards, 2 TD

=== Week 10: at Orlando Predators ===
Week 10: Cleveland Gladiators at Orlando Predators – Game summary

Quarter	1	2	3	4	Total
Gladiators	0	7	13	6	26
Predators	14	14	7	21	56

at Amway Center, Orlando, Florida

- Date: May 14
- Game time: 7:30 p.m. EDT
- Game attendance: 11,256
- Referee: Alex Kemp
- Recap

Game information

1st quarter

- Orlando – (10:29) T.T. Toliver 25-yard pass from Nick Hill (Mark Lewis kick), Orlando 7–0
- Orlando – (8:23) Nick Hill 6-yard run (Mark Lewis kick), Orlando 14–0

2nd quarter

- Cleveland – (13:55) Dominick Goodman 23-yard pass from Dan Whalen (Matt Denny kick), Orlando 14–7
- Orlando – (10:47) Robert Quiroga 16-yard pass from Nick Hill (Mark Lewis kick), Orlando 21–7
- Orlando – (0:10) Nick Hill 14-yard run (Mark Lewis kick), Orlando 28–7

3rd quarter

- Cleveland – (8:18) Troy Bergeron 5-yard pass from Dan Whalen (Matt Denny kick), Orlando 28–14
- Orlando – (4:23) Robert Quiroga 7-yard pass from Nick Hill (Mark Lewis kick), Orlando 35–14
- Cleveland – (1:30) Dan Whalen 2-yard run (Matt Denny kick blocked), Orlando 35–20

4th quarter

- Orlando – (14:14) Josh Bush 37-yard pass from Nick Hill (Mark Lewis kick), Orlando 42–20
- Cleveland – (11:19) Robert Redd 42-yard pass from Dan Whalen (Dan Whalen pass failed), Orlando 42–26
- Orlando – (8:03) Robert Quiroga 19-yard pass from Nick Hill (Mark Lewis kick), Orlando 49–26
- Orlando – (2:41) Josh Bush 2-yard pass from Nick Hill (Mark Lewis kick), Orlando 56–26

Passing

- Cleveland – Dan Whalen: 14/29, 200 yards, 3 TD
- Orlando – Nick Hill: 23/29, 267 yards, 6 TD

Rushing

- Cleveland – Dan Whalen: 5 att, 19 yards, 1 TD
- Orlando – Nick Hill: 5 att, 23 yards, 2 TD

Receiving

- Cleveland – Dominick Goodman: 7 rec, 114 yards, 1 TD
- Orlando – Josh Bush: 6 rec, 75 yards, 2 TD

=== Week 11: vs. Philadelphia Soul ===
Week 11: Philadelphia Soul at Cleveland Gladiators – Game summary

Quarter	1	2	3	4	Total
Soul	6	14	7	14	41
Gladiators	7	16	22	14	59

at Quicken Loans Arena, Cleveland, Ohio

- Date: May 21
- Game time: 7:00 p.m. EDT
- Game attendance: 7,979
- Referee: Tony Cannella
- Recap

Game information

1st quarter

- Cleveland – (8:46) Robert Redd 18-yard pass from Kurt Rocco (Matt Denny kick), Cleveland 7–0
- Philadelphia – (5:13) Syvelle Newton 10-yard pass from Ryan Vena (Robbie Smith kick failed), Cleveland 7–6

2nd quarter

- Cleveland – (14:53) Robert Redd 15-yard pass from Kurt Rocco (Matt Denny kick), Cleveland 14–6
- Cleveland – (13:27) Anthony Hoke safety, Cleveland 16–6
- Cleveland – (11:40) Adam Tadisch 15-yard pass from Kurt Rocco (Matt Denny kick), Cleveland 23–6
- Philadelphia – (8:55) Donovan Morgan 10-yard pass from Ryan Vena (Robbie Smith kick), Cleveland 23–13
- Philadelphia – (0:02) Syvelle Newton 5-yard pass from Ryan Vena (Robbie Smith kick), Cleveland 23–20

3rd quarter

- Cleveland – (9:22) Russell Monk 3-yard run (Matt Denny kick), Cleveland 30–20
- Cleveland – (8:31) Drew Berube safety, Cleveland 32–20
- Cleveland – (7:52) Thyron Lewis 10-yard pass from Kurt Rocco (Matt Denny kick), Cleveland 39–20
- Philadelphia – (6:45) Donovan Morgan 33-yard pass from Ryan Vena (Robbie Smith kick), Cleveland 39–27
- Cleveland – (2:37) Robert Redd 7-yard pass from Kurt Rocco (Dan Whalen rush failed), Cleveland 45–27

4th quarter

- Philadelphia – (12:38) Donovan Morgan 40-yard pass from Ryan Vena (Robbie Smith kick), Cleveland 45–34
- Cleveland – (10:02) Dominick Goodman 5-yard pass from Kurt Rocco (Matt Denny kick), Cleveland 52–34
- Philadelphia – (5:24) Donovan Morgan 7-yard pass from Ryan Vena (Robbie Smith kick), Cleveland 52–41
- Cleveland – (4:31) Robert Redd 12-yard pass from Kurt Rocco (Matt Denny kick), Cleveland 59–41

Passing

- Philadelphia – Ryan Vena: 20/31, 249 yards, 6 TD, 1 INT
- Cleveland – Kurt Rocco: 18/29, 233 yards, 7 TD

Rushing

- Philadelphia – Ryan Vena: 1 att, 2 yards
- Cleveland – Troy Bergeron: 1 att, 11 yards

Receiving

- Philadelphia – Donovan Morgan: 9 rec, 132 yards, 4 TD
- Cleveland – Robert Redd: 8 rec, 113 yards, 4 TD

=== Week 12: at Arizona Rattlers ===
Week 12: Cleveland Gladiators at Arizona Rattlers – Game summary

Quarter	1	2	3	4	Total
Gladiators	7	7	21	7	42
Rattlers	14	14	14	21	63

at US Airways Center, Phoenix, Arizona

- Date: May 28
- Game time: 10:00 p.m. EDT
- Game attendance: 7,987
- Referee: Shane Anderson
- Recap

Game information

1st quarter

- Cleveland – (9:55) Kurt Rocco 6-yard run (Matt Denny kick), Cleveland 7–0
- Arizona – (8:22) Jason Geathers 18-yard pass from Nick Davila (Fabrizio Scaccia kick), Tied 7–7
- Arizona – (2:56) Trandon Harvey 22-yard pass from Nick Davila (Fabrizio Scaccia kick), Arizona 14–7

2nd quarter

- Arizona – (12:28) Virgil Gray 52-yard missed field goal return (Fabrizio Scaccia kick), Arizona 21–7
- Cleveland – (7:58) Russell Monk 13-yard run (Matt Denny kick), Arizona 21–14
- Arizona – (3:58) Jason Geathers 13-yard pass from Nick Davila (Fabrizio Scaccia kick), Arizona 28–14

3rd quarter

- Cleveland – (9:31) Dominick Goodman 14-yard pass from Kurt Rocco (Matt Denny kick), Arizona 28–21
- Arizona – (7:46) Rod Windsor 2-yard pass from Nick Davila (Fabrizio Scaccia kick), Arizona 35–21
- Cleveland – (5:54) Kurt Rocco 2-yard run (Dan Whalen pass failed), Arizona 35–27
- Arizona – (2:47) Trandon Harvey 2-yard pass from Nick Davila (Fabrizio Scaccia kick), Arizona 42–27
- Cleveland – (0:43) Thyron Lewis 16-yard pass from Kurt Rocco (Kurt Rocco pass), Arizona 42–35

4th quarter

- Arizona – (11:27) Jason Geathers 3-yard pass from Nick Davila (Fabrizio Scaccia kick), Arizona 49–35
- Arizona – (7:42) Trandon Harvey 26-yard pass from Nick Davila (Fabrizio Scaccia kick failed), Arizona 55–35
- Cleveland – (3:51) Thyron Lewis 30-yard pass from Kurt Rocco (Matt Denny kick), Arizona 55–42
- Arizona – (2:46) Jason Geathers 9-yard pass from Nick Davila (John Booker rush), Arizona 63–42

Passing

- Cleveland – Kurt Rocco: 27/42, 328 yards, 3 TD, 2 INT
- Arizona – Nick Davila: 25/30, 263 yards, 8 TD, 1 INT

Rushing

- Cleveland – Russell Monk: 2 att, 13 yards, 1 TD
- Arizona – Odie Armstrong: 3 att, 7 yards

Receiving

- Cleveland – Thyron Lewis: 13 rec, 157 yards, 3 TD
- Arizona – Rod Windsor: 10 rec, 111 yards, 4 TD

=== Week 13: at Pittsburgh Power ===
Week 13: Cleveland Gladiators at Pittsburgh Power – Game summary

Quarter	1	2	3	4	Total
Gladiators	6	13	13	0	32
Power	7	14	14	0	35

at Consol Energy Center, Pittsburgh, Pennsylvania

- Date: June 4
- Game time: 7:30 p.m. EDT
- Game attendance: 9,066
- Referee: Larry Smith
- Recap

Game information

1st quarter

- Cleveland – (9:39) Robert Redd 4-yard pass from Kurt Rocco (Matt Denny kick failed), Cleveland 6–0
- Pittsburgh – (4:34) Joshua Rue 2-yard run (Paul Edinger kick), Pittsburgh 7–6

2nd quarter

- Pittsburgh – (10:36) Jason Willis 27-yard pass from Bernard Morris (Paul Edinger kick), Pittsburgh 14–6
- Cleveland – (4:35) Thyron Lewis 9-yard pass from Kurt Rocco (Matt Denny kick failed), Pittsburgh 14–12
- Pittsburgh – (2:48) Jason Willis 40-yard pass from Bernard Morris (Paul Edinger kick), Pittsburgh 21–12
- Cleveland – (0:38) Thyron Lewis 13-yard pass from Kurt Rocco (Matt Denny kick), Pittsburgh 21–19

3rd quarter

- Cleveland – (11:55) Robert Redd 8-yard pass from Kurt Rocco (Matt Denny kick failed), Cleveland 25–21
- Pittsburgh – (10:15) Mike Lucian 1-yard run (Paul Edinger kick), Pittsburgh 28–25
- Cleveland – (5:54) Kurt Rocco 2-yard run (Matt Denny kick), Cleveland 32–28
- Pittsburgh – (3:46) Lonnell Dewalt 18-yard pass from Bernard Morris (Paul Edinger kick), Pittsburgh 35–32

4th quarter

No scoring

Passing

- Cleveland – Kurt Rocco: 28/43, 261 yards, 4 TD, 1 INT
- Pittsburgh – Bernard Morris: 17/23, 210 yards, 3 TD

Rushing

- Cleveland – Kurt Rocco: 5 att, 12 yards, 1 TD
- Pittsburgh – Bernard Morris: 8 att, 64 yards

Receiving

- Cleveland – Thyron Lewis: 9 rec, 104 yards, 2 TD
- Pittsburgh – Jason Willis: 5 rec, 105 yards, 2 TD

=== Week 14: vs. Georgia Force ===
Week 14: Georgia Force at Cleveland Gladiators – Game summary

Quarter	1	2	3	4	Total
Force	7	21	7	13	48
Gladiators	21	14	7	20	62

at Quicken Loans Arena, Cleveland, Ohio

- Date: June 11
- Game time: 7:00 p.m. EDT
- Game attendance: 5,029
- Referee: Tony Cannella
- Recap

Game information

1st quarter

- Cleveland – (10:53) Russell Monk 3-yard run (Matt Denny kick), Cleveland 7–0
- Georgia – (8:34) Ben McDowell 1-yard run (Carlos Martinez kick), Tied 7–7
- Cleveland – (4:56) Thyron Lewis 5-yard pass from Kurt Rocco (Matt Denny kick), Cleveland 14–7
- Cleveland – (3:04) Joe Phinisee 27-yard interception return (Matt Denny kick), Cleveland 21–7

2nd quarter

- Georgia – (12:22) Ben McDowell 1-yard run (Carlos Martinez kick), Cleveland 21–14
- Cleveland – (11:33) Quorey Payne 56-yard kickoff return (Matt Denny kick blocked), Cleveland 27–14
- Georgia – (8:19) Ben McDowell 1-yard run (Carlos Martinez kick), Cleveland 27–21
- Georgia – (5:10) Brett Elliott 4-yard run (Carlos Martinez kick), Georgia 28–27
- Cleveland – (1:02) Calvin Wilson 4-yard pass from Kurt Rocco (Kurt Rocco pass), Cleveland 35–28

3rd quarter

- Georgia – (10:46) Larry Shipp 3-yard pass from Brett Elliott (Carlos Martinez kick), Tied 35–35
- Cleveland – (7:24) Robert Redd 6-yard pass from Kurt Rocco (Matt Denny kick), Cleveland 42–35

4th quarter

- Cleveland – (14:11) Dominick Goodman 11-yard pass from Kurt Rocco (Matt Denny kick), Cleveland 49–35
- Georgia – (10:11) Mike Johnson 4-yard pass from Brett Elliott (Carlos Martinez kick blocked), Cleveland 49–41
- Cleveland – (7:52) Thyron Lewis 9-yard pass from Kurt Rocco (Matt Denny kick), Cleveland 56–41
- Georgia – (5:17) Larry Shipp 3-yard pass from Brett Elliott (Carlos Martinez kick), Cleveland 56–48
- Cleveland – (2:16) Quorey Payne 11-yard pass from Kurt Rocco (Matt Denny kick failed), Cleveland 62–48

Passing

- Georgia – Brett Elliott: 31/42, 318 yards, 3 TD, 3 INT
- Cleveland – Kurt Rocco: 23/29, 212 yards, 6 TD

Rushing

- Georgia – Ben McDowell: 6 att, 4 yards, 3 TD
- Cleveland – Russell Monk: 2 att, 3 yards, 1 TD

Receiving

- Georgia – Larry Shipp: 13 rec, 138 yards, 2 TD
- Cleveland – Dominick Goodman: 10 rec, 122 yards, 1 TD

=== Week 15: at Kansas City Command ===
Week 15: Cleveland Gladiators at Kansas City Command – Game summary

Quarter	1	2	3	4	Total
Gladiators	14	7	13	7	41
Command	13	13	14	10	50

at Sprint Center, Kansas City, Missouri

- Date: June 19
- Game time: 2:00 p.m. EDT
- Game attendance: 3,938
- Referee: Larry Smith
- Recap

Game information

1st quarter

- Kansas City – (11:26) Bradley Chavez 6-yard pass from Steve Wasil (Brian Umstead kick), Kansas City 7–0
- Cleveland – (7:16) Dominick Goodman 6-yard pass from Kurt Rocco (Matt Denny kick), Tied 7–7
- Kansas City – (4:09) Bradley Chavez 12-yard pass from Steve Wasil (Brian Umstead kick failed), Kansas City 13–7
- Cleveland – (0:57) Dominick Goodman 17-yard pass from Kurt Rocco (Matt Denny kick), Cleveland 14–13

2nd quarter

- Cleveland – (6:58) Robert Redd 7-yard pass from Kurt Rocco (Matt Denny kick), Cleveland 21–13
- Kansas City – (2:04) Steve Wasil 1-yard run (Brian Umstead kick), Cleveland 21–20
- Kansas City – (0:14) Robert Gill 9-yard pass from Steve Wasil (Brian Umstead kick failed), Kansas City 26–21

3rd quarter

- Kansas City – (12:40) Bret Smith 32-yard pass from Steve Wasil (Brian Umstead kick), Kansas City 33–21
- Cleveland – (10:18) Thyron Lewis 33-yard pass from Kurt Rocco (Matt Denny kick), Kansas City 33–28
- Kansas City – (4:59) Bradley Chavez 16-yard pass from Steve Wasil (Brian Umstead kick), Kansas City 40–28
- Cleveland – (0:18) Russell Monk 3-yard run (Matt Denny kick failed), Kansas City 40–34

4th quarter

- Kansas City – (11:12) Steve Wasil 1-yard run (Brian Umstead kick), Kansas City 47–34
- Cleveland – (4:22) Kurt Rocco 6-yard run (Matt Denny kick), Kansas City 47–41
- Kansas City – (0:43) Brian Umstead 23-yard field goal, Kansas City 50–41

Passing

- Cleveland – Kurt Rocco: 20/38, 258 yards, 4 TD, 1 INT
- Kansas City – J.J. Raterink: 19/23, 243 yards, 5 TD

Rushing

- Cleveland – Russell Monk: 5 att, 10 yards, 1 TD
- Kansas City – Trey Bryant: 10 att, 39 yards

Receiving

- Cleveland – Thyron Lewis: 6 rec, 97 yards, 1 TD
- Kansas City – Bradley Chavez: 8 rec, 81 yards, 3 TD

=== Week 16: vs. San Jose SaberCats ===
Week 16: San Jose SaberCats at Cleveland Gladiators – Game summary

Quarter	1	2	3	4	Total
SaberCats	0	7	7	7	21
Gladiators	12	29	20	21	82

at Quicken Loans Arena, Cleveland, Ohio

- Date: June 25
- Game time: 7:00 p.m. EDT
- Game attendance: 5,617
- Referee: Tony Cannella
- Recap

Game information

1st quarter

- Cleveland – (12:41) Troy Bergeron 15-yard pass from Andrico Hines (Matt Denny kick failed), Cleveland 6–0
- Cleveland – (2:09) Troy Bergeron 24-yard pass from Andrico Hines (Matt Denny kick failed), Cleveland 12–0

2nd quarter

- Cleveland – (3:16) Robert Redd 12-yard pass from Kurt Rocco (Kurt Rocco pass), Cleveland 20–0
- San Jose – (0:51) Marco Thomas 4-yard pass from Mark Grieb (Juan Gamboa kick), Cleveland 20–7
- Cleveland – (0:20) Levy Brown 51-yard interception return (Kurt Rocco pass), Cleveland 28–7
- Cleveland – (0:02) Troy Bergeron 13-yard pass from Kurt Rocco (Matt Denny kick), Cleveland 35–7
- Cleveland – (0:00) Connor Reilly 0-yard net recovery (Matt Denny kick failed), Cleveland 41–7

3rd quarter

- Cleveland – (11:21) Troy Bergeron 4-yard pass from Kurt Rocco (Matt Denny kick failed), Cleveland 47–7
- Cleveland – (5:12) Robert Redd 20-yard pass from Kurt Rocco (Matt Denny kick), Cleveland 54–7
- Cleveland – (3:50) Joe Phinisee 7-yard interception return (Matt Denny kick), Cleveland 61–7
- San Jose – (1:56) Ben Nelson 14-yard pass from McLeod Bethel-Thompson (Juan Gamboa kick), Cleveland 61–14

4th quarter

- Cleveland – (14:54) Quorey Payne 24-yard pass from Kurt Rocco (Matt Denny kick), Cleveland 68–14
- San Jose – (11:23) Victor James 8-yard run (Juan Gamboa kick), Cleveland 68–21
- Cleveland – (8:24) Troy Bergeron 28-yard pass from Kurt Rocco (Matt Denny kick), Cleveland 75–21
- Cleveland – (0:54) Robert Redd 48-yard pass from Kurt Rocco (Matt Denny kick), Cleveland 82–21

Passing

- San Jose – Mark Grieb: 20/34, 203 yards, 1 TD, 3 INT
- Cleveland – Kurt Rocco: 18/20, 235 yards, 7 TD

Rushing

- San Jose – McLeod Bethel-Thompson: 2 att, 24 yards
- Cleveland – Kurt Rocco: 1 att, 10 yards

Receiving

- San Jose – Ben Nelson: 8 rec, 101 yards, 1 TD
- Cleveland – Troy Bergeron: 10 rec, 136 yards, 5 TD

=== Week 17: at Milwaukee Mustangs ===
Week 17: Cleveland Gladiators at Milwaukee Mustangs – Game summary

Quarter	1	2	3	4	Total
Gladiators	7	14	21	20	62
Mustangs	7	14	7	30	58

at Bradley Center, Milwaukee, Wisconsin

- Date: July 2
- Game time: 8:00 p.m. EDT
- Game attendance: 5,633
- Referee: Tom Mccabe
- Recap

Game information

1st quarter

- Cleveland – (10:33) Dominick Goodman 8-yard pass from Kurt Rocco (Matt Denny kick), Cleveland 7–0
- Milwaukee – (3:55) Dwayne Eley Jr. 6-yard pass from Gino Guidugli (Garrett Lindholm kick), Tied 7–7

2nd quarter

- Milwaukee – (14:32) Dwayne Eley Jr. 20-yard pass from Gino Guidugli (Garrett Lindholm kick), Milwaukee 14–7
- Cleveland – (9:07) Kurt Rocco 1-yard run (Matt Denny kick), Tied 14–14
- Milwaukee – (5:56) Victor Williams 8-yard pass from Gino Guidugli (Garrett Lindholm kick), Milwaukee 21–14
- Cleveland – (0:50) Anthony Hoke 5-yard fumble recovery (Matt Denny kick), Tied 21–21

3rd quarter

- Milwaukee – (9:59) Justin Lawrence 1-yard run (Garrett Lindholm kick), Milwaukee 28–21
- Cleveland – (5:48) Troy Bergeron 29-yard pass from Kurt Rocco (Matt Denny kick), Tied 28–28
- Cleveland – (3:34) Robert Redd 22-yard pass from Kurt Rocco (Matt Denny kick), Cleveland 35–28
- Cleveland – (0:49) Mike Bragg 16-yard interception return (Matt Denny kick), Cleveland 42–28

4th quarter

- Milwaukee – (12:02) Dwayne Eley Jr. 23-yard pass from Gino Guidugli (Garrett Lindholm kick), Cleveland 42–35
- Cleveland – (9:36) Kurt Rocco 3-yard run (Matt Denny kick), Cleveland 49–35
- Milwaukee – (6:15) Gino Guidugli 4-yard run (Garrett Lindholm kick), Milwaukee 49–42
- Milwaukee – (4:33) Gino Guidugli 1-yard run (Garrett Lindholm kick), Tied 49–49
- Cleveland – (1:32) Troy Bergeron 15-yard pass from Kurt Rocco (Matt Denny kick blocked), Cleveland 55–49
- Milwaukee – (1:32) Brand Brinkley PAT return, Cleveland 55–51
- Milwaukee – (0:41) Dwayne Eley Jr. 41-yard pass from Gino Guidugli (Garrett Lindholm kick), Milwaukee 58–55
- Cleveland – (0:03) Kurt Rocco 8-yard run (Matt Denny kick), Cleveland 62–48

Passing

- Cleveland – Kurt Rocco: 20/36, 257 yards, 4 TD, 1 INT
- Milwaukee – Gino Guidugli: 23/33, 285 yards, 5 TD, 1 INT

Rushing

- Cleveland – Kurt Rocco: 3 att, 12 yards, 3 TD
- Milwaukee – Gino Guidugli: 3 att, 10 yards, 1 TD

Receiving

- Cleveland – Thyron Lewis: 7 rec, 113 yards, 2 TD
- Milwaukee – Dwayne Eley Jr.: 8 rec, 143 yards, 4 TD

=== Week 18: at Philadelphia Soul ===
Week 18: Cleveland Gladiators at Philadelphia Soul – Game summary

Quarter	1	2	3	4	Total
Gladiators	7	0	7	7	21
Soul	14	13	15	7	49

at Wells Fargo Center, Philadelphia, Pennsylvania

- Date: July 8
- Game time: 8:00 p.m. EDT
- Game attendance: 9,761
- Referee: Jim Corpora
- Recap

Game information

1st quarter

- Philadelphia – (11:58) Larry Brackins 15-yard pass from Ryan Vena (Jon Striefsky kick), Philadelphia 7–0
- Philadelphia – (5:30) Larry Brackins 4-yard pass from Ryan Vena (Jon Striefsky kick), Philadelphia 14–0
- Cleveland – (3:35) Troy Bergeron 32-yard pass from Kurt Rocco (Matt Denny kick), Philadelphia 14–7

2nd quarter

- Philadelphia – (12:45) Jon Striefsky 20-yard field goal, Philadelphia 17–7
- Philadelphia – (3:58) Syvelle Newton 3-yard run (Jon Striefsky kick), Philadelphia 24–7
- Philadelphia – (0:00) Jon Striefsky 19-yard field goal, Philadelphia 27–7

3rd quarter

- Philadelphia – (11:52) Larry Brackins 17-yard pass from Ryan Vena (Jon Striefsky kick), Philadelphia 34–7
- Philadelphia – (9:03) Dustin Barno safety, Philadelphia 36–7
- Cleveland – (1:00) Kurt Rocco 1-yard run (Matt Denny kick), Philadelphia 36–14
- Philadelphia – (0:06) Ryan Vena 4-yard run (Jon Striefsky kick blocked), Philadelphia 42–14

4th quarter

- Philadelphia – (7:05) Ryan Vena 10-yard run (Jon Striefsky kick), Philadelphia 49–14
- Cleveland – (2:52) Troy Bergeron 11-yard pass from Kurt Rocco (Matt Denny kick), Philadelphia 49–21

Passing

- Cleveland – Kurt Rocco: 19/33, 201 yards, 2 TD, 2 INT
- Philadelphia – Ryan Vena: 21/31, 245 yards, 3 TD, 1 INT

Rushing

- Cleveland – Kurt Rocco: 5 att, 11 yards, 1 TD
- Philadelphia – Ryan Vena: 5 att, 30 yards, 2 TD

Receiving

- Cleveland – Troy Bergeron: 4 rec, 67 yards, 2 TD
- Philadelphia – Larry Brackins: 9 rec, 133 yards, 3 TD

=== Week 19: vs. Pittsburgh Power ===
Week 19: Pittsburgh Power at Cleveland Gladiators – Game summary

Quarter	1	2	3	4	Total
Power	7	21	20	7	55
Gladiators	14	25	8	20	67

at Quicken Loans Arena, Cleveland, Ohio

- Date: July 15
- Game time: 8:00 p.m. EDT
- Game attendance: 8,139
- Referee: Alex Kemp
- Recap

Game information

1st quarter

- Cleveland – (12:47) Troy Bergeron 18-yard pass from Kurt Rocco (Matt Denny kick), Cleveland 7–0
- Pittsburgh – (8:11) Jason Willis 33-yard pass from Bernard Morris (Paul Edinger kick), Tied 7–7
- Cleveland – (2:09) Robert Redd 9-yard pass from Kurt Rocco (Matt Denny kick), Cleveland 14–7

2nd quarter

- Cleveland – (12:11) Troy Bergeron 13-yard pass from Kurt Rocco (Matt Denny kick), Cleveland 20–7
- Pittsburgh – (8:49) Bernard Morris 1-yard run (Paul Edinger kick), Cleveland 20–14
- Cleveland – (6:45) Robert Redd 22-yard pass from Kurt Rocco (Matt Denny kick blocked), Cleveland 26–14
- Cleveland – (5:19) Tim Cheatwood 0-yard fumble recovery (Kurt Rocco pass failed), Cleveland 32–14
- Pittsburgh – (1:45) Jason Willis 9-yard pass from Bernard Morris (Paul Edinger kick), Cleveland 32–21
- Cleveland – (0:39) Robert Redd 24-yard pass from Kurt Rocco (Matt Denny kick), Cleveland 39–21
- Pittsburgh – (0:05) Michael Washington 8-yard pass from Bernard Morris (Paul Edinger kick), Cleveland 39–28

3rd quarter

- Pittsburgh – (10:28) Irvin Campbell 5-yard pass from Bernard Morris (Paul Edinger kick), Cleveland 39–35
- Pittsburgh – (6:02) Lonnell Dewalt 13-yard pass from Bernard Morris (Paul Edinger kick failed), Pittsburgh 41–39
- Cleveland – (2:52) Clifford Louis 5-yard pass from Kurt Rocco (Kurt Rocco pass), Cleveland 47–41
- Pittsburgh – (0:12) Jason Willis 22-yard pass from Bernard Morris (Paul Edinger kick), Pittsburgh 48–47

4th quarter

- Cleveland – (10:52) Dominick Goodman 18-yard pass from Kurt Rocco (Matt Denny kick), Cleveland 54–48
- Cleveland – (8:27) Russell Monk 2-yard run (Kurt Rocco pass failed), Cleveland 60–48
- Cleveland – (4:00) Dominick Goodman 16-yard pass from Kurt Rocco (Matt Denny kick), Cleveland 67–48
- Pittsburgh – (0:41) Lonnell Dewalt 3-yard pass from Bernard Morris (Paul Edinger kick), Cleveland 67–55

Passing

- Pittsburgh – Bernard Morris: 28/41, 318 yards, 7 TD
- Cleveland – Kurt Rocco: 25/35, 297 yards, 8 TD

Rushing

- Pittsburgh – Bernard Morris: 8 att, 23 yards, 1 TD
- Cleveland – Carlos Downey: 2 att, 6 yards

Receiving

- Pittsburgh – Jason Willis: 9 rec, 134 yards, 3 TD
- Cleveland – Dominick Goodman: 12 rec, 130 yards, 2 TD

=== Week 20: vs. Utah Blaze ===
Week 20: Utah Blaze at Cleveland Gladiators – Game summary

Quarter	1	2	3	4	Total
Blaze	9	25	13	29	76
Gladiators	13	21	14	21	69

at Quicken Loans Arena, Cleveland, Ohio

- Date: July 22
- Game time: 8:30 p.m. EDT
- Game attendance: 6,190
- Referee: Jim Corpora
- Recap

Game information

1st quarter

- Cleveland – (8:59) Thyron Lewis 15-yard pass from Kurt Rocco (Matt Denny kick), Cleveland 7–0
- Utah – (4:21) Alvance Robinson 6-yard pass from Todd Hammel (Kyle Brotzman kick), Tied 7–7
- Cleveland – (2:16) Dominick Goodman 16-yard pass from Kurt Rocco (Matt Denny kick blocked), Cleveland 13–7
- Utah – (2:16) Jeramie Richardson PAT return, Cleveland 13–9

2nd quarter

- Utah – (13:45) Justin Ore 6-yard pass from Todd Hammel (Kyle Brotzman rush), Utah 17–13
- Cleveland – (7:43) Russell Monk 3-yard run (Matt Denny kick), Cleveland 20–17
- Utah – (5:26) Justin Ore 24-yard pass from Todd Hammel (Kyle Brotzman kick), Utah 24–20
- Cleveland – (2:50) Robert Redd 24-yard pass from Kurt Rocco (Matt Denny kick), Cleveland 27–24
- Utah – (1:03) Alvance Robinson 39-yard pass from Todd Hammel (Kyle Brotzman kick), Utah 31–27
- Cleveland – (0:51) Robert Redd 11-yard pass from Kurt Rocco (Matt Denny kick), Cleveland 34–31
- Utah – (0:00) Kyle Brotzman 34-yard field goal, Tied 34–34

3rd quarter

- Cleveland – (13:10) Dominick Goodman 20-yard pass from Troy Weatherhead (Matt Denny kick), Cleveland 41–34
- Utah – (11:19) Alvance Robinson 32-yard pass from Todd Hammel (Kyle Brotzman kick), Tied 41–41
- Cleveland – (7:35) Thyron Lewis 1-yard run (Matt Denny kick), Cleveland 48–41
- Utah – (6:40) Chris Bocage 56-yard kickoff return (Kyle Brotzman kick blocked), Cleveland 48–47

4th quarter

- Cleveland – (14:48) Robert Redd 47-yard pass from Troy Weatherhead (Matt Denny kick), Cleveland 55–47
- Utah – (12:52) Ben Stallings 24-yard run (Todd Hammel pass failed), Cleveland 55–53
- Utah – (7:53) Ben Stallings 2-yard run (Todd Hammel pass), Utah 61–55
- Cleveland – (4:40) Dominick Goodman 4-yard pass from Troy Weatherhead (Matt Denny kick), Cleveland 62–61
- Utah – (0:42) Alvance Robinson 4-yard pass from Todd Hammel (Todd Hammel pass), Utah 69–62
- Cleveland – (0:21) Dominick Goodman 35-yard pass from Troy Weatherhead (Matt Denny kick), Tied 69–69
- Utah – (0:04) Justin Ore 29-yard pass from Todd Hammel (Kyle Brotzman kick), Utah 76–69

Passing

- Utah – Todd Hammel: 31/44, 355 yards, 7 TD, 1 INT
- Cleveland – Troy Weatherhead: 10/14, 178 yards, 4 TD

Rushing

- Utah – Ben Stallings: 9 att, 53 yards, 2 TD
- Cleveland – Russell Monk: 5 att, 15 yards, 1 TD

Receiving

- Utah – Alvance Robinson: 9 rec, 117 yards, 4 TD
- Cleveland – Dominick Goodman: 12 rec, 144 yards, 4 TD

== Playoffs ==
=== American Conference Semifinals: vs. (3) Georgia Force ===
American Conference Semifinals: Georgia Force at Cleveland Gladiators – Game summary

Quarter	1	2	3	4	Total
(3) Force	7	13	14	16	50
(2) Gladiators	14	7	0	20	41

at Quicken Loans Arena, Cleveland, Ohio

- Date: July 31
- Game time: 3:00 p.m. EDT
- Game attendance: 4,948
- Referee: Tony Cannella
- Recap

Game information

1st quarter

- Georgia – (11:40) Larry Shipp 9-yard pass from Darnell Kennedy (Carlos Martinez kick), Georgia 7–0
- Cleveland – (9:22) Robert Redd 30-yard pass from Kurt Rocco (Matt Denny kick), Tied 7–7
- Cleveland – (5:27) Troy Bergeron 12-yard pass from Kurt Rocco (Matt Denny kick), Cleveland 14–7

2nd quarter

- Georgia – (12:20) Benji McDowell 1-yard run (Carlos Martinez kick), Tied 14–14
- Cleveland – (10:25) Robert Redd 9-yard pass from Kurt Rocco (Matt Denny kick), Cleveland 21–14
- Georgia – (0:00) Mike Johnson 2-yard fumble recovery (Carlos Martinez kick failed), Cleveland 21–20

3rd quarter

- Georgia – (10:26) Maurice Purify 16-yard pass from Darnell Kennedy (Carlos Martinez kick), Georgia 27–21
- Georgia – (5:45) Ahmad Hawkins 40-yard fumble recovery (Carlos Martinez kick), Georgia 34–21

4th quarter

- Georgia – (14:55) Maurice Purify 7-yard pass from Darnell Kennedy (Carlos Martinez kick blocked), Georgia 40–21
- Cleveland – (11:03) Troy Bergeron 13-yard pass from John Dutton (Matt Denny kick blocked), Georgia 40–27
- Georgia – (3:54) Carlos Martinez 21-yard field goal, Georgia 43–27
- Cleveland – (1:04) Robert Redd 3-yard pass from John Dutton (Russell Monk rush), Georgia 43–35
- Georgia – (0:36) Darnell Kennedy 15-yard run (Carlos Martinez kick), Georgia 50–35
- Cleveland – (0:25) Troy Bergeron 7-yard pass from John Dutton (Matt Denny kick blocked), 50–41

Passing

- Georgia – Darnell Kennedy: 18/35, 202 yards, 3 TD
- Cleveland – Kurt Rocco: 15/20, 164 yards, 3 TD, 1 INT

Rushing

- Georgia – Darnell Kennedy: 4 att, 19 yards, 1 TD
- Cleveland – Carlos Downey: 1 att, 7 yards

Receiving

- Georgia – Maurice Purify: 7 rec, 91 yards, 2 TD
- Cleveland – Troy Bergeron: 10 rec, 119 yards, 3 TD
