= William Durst =

William Durst may refer to:

- William Frederick Durst (born 1970), also known as Fred Durst, founder of band Limp Bizkit
- Will Durst (born 1952), American political satirist
