= Will Durst =

American comedian

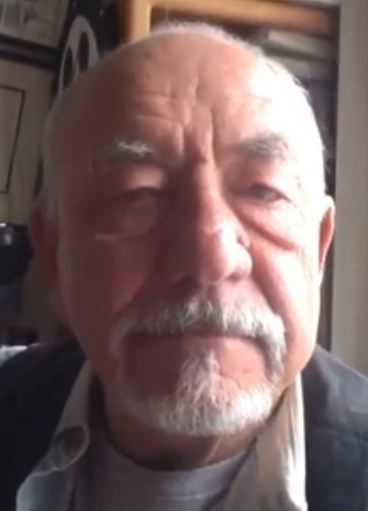
- In an online interview with Alex Bennett in July 2019
- Born: March 18, 1952 (age 74); Milwaukee, Wisconsin, United States

Comedy career
- Medium: Stand-up, television, radio, writing
- Genres: Observational comedy, satire, political satire, black comedy, surreal humor, sarcasm
- Subjects: American culture, everyday life, human behavior, American politics, popular culture
- Website: willdurst.com

Will Durst (born March 18, 1952) is an American political satirist. He has been likened to Mort Sahl and Will Rogers.

== Early life ==
Durst was born in Milwaukee, Wisconsin. He went to 14 different schools before graduating from Waukesha South High School, in Waukesha, Wisconsin. He then attended Waukesha County Technical Institute, University of Wisconsin, Waukesha County Campus, Marquette University, and the University of Wisconsin–Milwaukee, but never graduated.

== Career ==
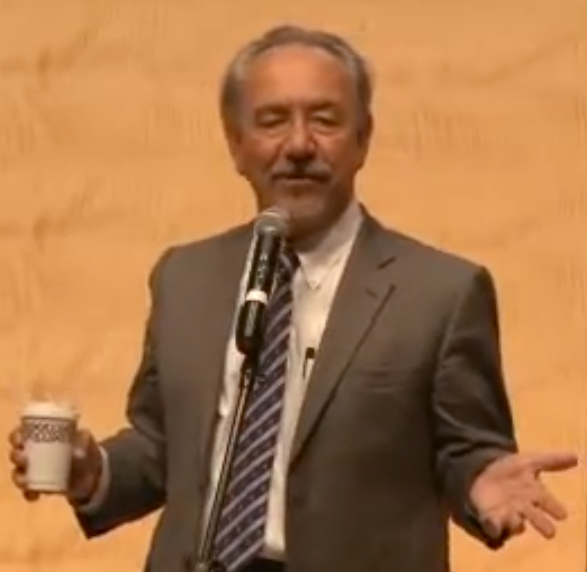
Performing at the San Francisco Public Library in 2014

In 1974, he started performing stand-up comedy at a weekly open mic at a bar in downtown Milwaukee called the Rusty Nail. He also gained onstage experience sharing a stage with various sketch groups such as "Same Player Shoots Again", "Better Than a Sharp Stick in the Eye", and "Will Jon Rip Marian?" After studying with director Paul Sills in Milwaukee for two years at the Century Hall theater complex, Durst moved to San Francisco in 1979.

In 1987, he unsuccessfully ran for mayor of San Francisco.

In 1992 Mr. Durst performed for a SRO crowd at FCI Sheridan in Sheridan, Oregon.

Durst composes a weekly political humor column that is contributed by Cagle Cartoons. He also co-hosts a monthly talk radio show with former San Francisco Mayor Willie Brown called The Will and Willie Show, which for a year ran as a morning show on San Francisco's progressive talk radio station, KQKE.

He has performed at events starring Bill Clinton, George H. W. Bush, and Al Gore. He also performs stand up comedy at many events as a keynote speaker including a Governors Conference and a Mayors Convention. He was a correspondent for The Comedy Channel during the 1992 political conventions. His humor and commentaries accentuate his perspective of illogical and absurd aspects of politics, leadership, and human behavior.

He pens down several Internet columns, contributes to Independent Media Institute's Alternet.org and the Huffington Post consistently, is a former contributing editor to National Lampoon and George, and has contributed to various periodicals such as the New York Times, Funny Times and San Francisco Chronicle. His weekly podcasts can be heard on various radio stations and his website, willdurst.com. He also writes a bi-monthly column for The Progressive Magazine, published in Madison, Wisconsin.

Will premiered his one-man show—The All-American Sport of BiPartisan Bashing—in August 2007 at New York City's New World Stages Off Broadway. In 2012, he premiered his one-man show focused on the presidential election, Elect to Laugh, which ran for 41 weeks at the San Francisco Marsh Theater. In 2013, Durst wrote a show based on being an aging baby boomer called BoomeRaging: From LSD to OMG. Since then, he has performed it in over 50 different cities, mostly in Northern California.

In 2016, he updated his Elect to Laugh show and performed a post-Trump one-man show called Durst Case Scenario every Tuesday at the Marsh (a theater complex in San Francisco) since July. He has also taken the show to many Northern California theaters and venues in Wisconsin, Washington, Nevada, and Colorado. He is working on an updated version of the show called Durst Case Scenario: Midterm Madness.

Durst has written three books, including Elect to Laugh and The All-American Sport of Bipartisan Bashing. He has also released five audio recordings, None of the Above, You Can't Make Stuff Up Like This, Warning, Raging Moderate, and Elect to Laugh, the last two on the Stand-Up! Records label. Along with Larry Bubbles Brown and Johnny Steele, Durst is one of the titular characters in the feature documentary 3 Still Standing directed by Robert Campos and Donna LoCicero, which focuses on the San Francisco comedy scene of the late 1980s and beyond.

=== Television ===
Durst has been fired by the San Francisco Examiner twice and PBS cancelled three of his shows, two of which he hosted and created, The Durst Amendment and Citizen Durst.

His pilot A Year's Worth with Will Durst was nominated for a CableACE Award after airing on A&E during New Year's Eve 1994, but it was never picked up.

On February 24, 2000, Durst was contestant Rudy Reber's phone-a-friend lifeline on Who Wants to Be a Millionaire. Durst wrote an article for TV Guide on the incident.

A five-time Emmy nominee and host/co-producer of the PBS series Livelyhood, he is also a recurrent commentator on NPR, CNN, and C-SPAN. He has appeared on television over 800 times including Late Night with David Letterman, Comedy Central, HBO, and Showtime. He received seven consecutive nominations for the American Comedy Awards Stand Up Comedian of the Year.

== Personal life ==
Durst lives in San Francisco with his wife Debi Ann Pickell Durst, an actress, improviser and director. She is an executive producer of San Francisco's annual Comedy Celebration Day in Golden Gate Park.

On October 7, 2019 Durst suffered a hemorrhagic stroke, backstage before a performance at the Presidio Theatre.
