= 2011 Philadelphia Soul season =

Arena Football League team season

- Head coach: Mike Hohensee
- Home stadium: Wells Fargo Center

Results
- Record: 6–12
- Division place: 4th
- Playoffs: Did not qualify

The 2011 Philadelphia Soul season was the 6th season for the franchise in the Arena Football League. The team was coached by Mike Hohensee and played their home games at Wells Fargo Center. This was the first season for the Soul since they won ArenaBowl XXII in 2008, after the league went on hiatus in 2009 and the franchise was not active in 2010. The Soul finished the season 6–12, and missed the playoffs.

== Standings ==
East Division
Team	W	L	PCT	PF	PA	DIV	CON	Home	Away
y-Cleveland Gladiators	10	8	.556	904	842	4–2	6–5	7–2	3–6
Pittsburgh Power	9	9	.500	870	972	4–2	5–6	5–4	4–5
Milwaukee Mustangs	7	11	.389	872	867	1–5	3–8	4–5	3–6
Philadelphia Soul	6	12	.333	914	969	3–3	5–6	4–5	2–7

y - Clinched division

== Regular season schedule ==
The Soul played in the first game of the 2011 AFL season on the road against the Pittsburgh Power on March 11. Their first home game of the season did not come until Week 6 against the Tampa Bay Storm on April 16. They hosted the Power in their final regular season game on July 22.

Week	Day	Date	Kickoff	Opponent	Results		Location	Report
Week	Day	Date	Kickoff	Opponent	Score	Record	Location	Report
1	Friday	March 11	8:00 p.m. EST	at Pittsburgh Power	W 58–52 (OT)	1–0	Consol Energy Center	
2	Friday	March 18	8:00 p.m. EDT	at Chicago Rush	L 28–62	1–1	Allstate Arena	
3	Bye							
4	Monday	April 4	7:30 p.m. EDT	at Milwaukee Mustangs	L 49–51	1–2	Bradley Center	
5	Saturday	April 9	7:30 p.m. EDT	at Orlando Predators	L 46–53	1–3	Amway Center	
6	Friday	April 15	8:00 p.m. EDT	Tampa Bay Storm	L 48–51	1–4	Wells Fargo Center	
7	Friday	April 22	10:30 p.m. EDT	at San Jose SaberCats	L 61–68	1–5	HP Pavilion at San Jose	
8	Saturday	April 30	8:05 p.m. EDT	at Iowa Barnstormers	W 76–62	2–5	Wells Fargo Arena	
9	Friday	May 6	7:05 p.m. EDT	Jacksonville Sharks	L 42–58	2–6	Wells Fargo Center	
10	Friday	May 13	7:05 p.m. EDT	Georgia Force	W 68–49	3–6	Wells Fargo Center	
11	Saturday	May 21	7:00 p.m. EDT	at Cleveland Gladiators	L 41–59	3–7	Quicken Loans Arena	
12	Friday	May 27	7:05 p.m. EDT	New Orleans VooDoo	W 70–49	4–7	Wells Fargo Center	
13	Friday	June 3	7:05 p.m. EDT	Milwaukee Mustangs	W 39–37	5–7	Wells Fargo Center	
14	Friday	June 10	8:00 p.m. EDT	at Spokane Shock	L 54–75	5–8	Spokane Veterans Memorial Arena	
15	Friday	June 17	7:05 p.m. EDT	Tulsa Talons	L 42–48	5–9	Wells Fargo Center	
16	Saturday	June 25	7:05 p.m. EDT	Arizona Rattlers	L 54–55	5–10	Wells Fargo Center	
17	Saturday	July 2	8:30 p.m. EDT	at Dallas Vigilantes	L 41–58	5–11	American Airlines Center	
18	Friday	July 8	8:00 p.m. EDT	Cleveland Gladiators	W 49–21	6–11	Wells Fargo Center	
19	Bye							
20	Friday	July 22	7:05 p.m. EDT	Pittsburgh Power	L 48–61	6–12	Wells Fargo Center	

== Regular season ==
=== Week 1: at Pittsburgh Power ===
Week 1: Philadelphia Soul at Pittsburgh Power – Game summary

Quarter	1	2	3	4	OT	Total
Soul	7	17	13	15	6	58
Power	21	6	7	18	0	52

at Consol Energy Center, Pittsburgh, Pennsylvania

- Date: March 11
- Game time: 8:00 p.m. EST
- Game attendance: 13,904
- Referee: Perry Havener
- Recap

Game information

1st quarter

- Pittsburgh – (13:47) Jason Willis 37-yard pass from Bernard Morris (Paul Edinger kick), Pittsburgh 7–0
- Philadelphia – (10:02) Donovan Morgan 46-yard from Justin Allgood (James Paul kick), Tied 7–7
- Pittsburgh – (7:37) Michael Washington 21-yard pass from Bernard Morris (Paul Edinger kick), Pittsburgh 14–7
- Pittsburgh – (3:32) Lonnell Dewalt 14-yard pass from Bernard Morris (Paul Edinger kick), Pittsburgh 21–7

2nd quarter

- Philadelphia – (11:57) Donovan Morgan 5-yard pass from Justin Allgood (James Paul kick), Pittsburgh 21–14
- Pittsburgh – (8:46) Joshua Rue 2-yard run (Paul Edinger kick failed), Pittsburgh 27–14
- Philadelphia – (4:08) Donovan Morgan 2-yard run (James Paul kick), Pittsburgh 27–21
- Philadelphia – (0:00) James Paul 18-yard field goal, Pittsburgh 27–24

3rd quarter

- Philadelphia – (10:01) Ryan Vena 1-yard run (James Paul kick failed), Philadelphia 30–27
- Philadelphia – (4:27) Donovan Morgan 20-yard pass from Justin Allgood (James Paul kick), Philadelphia 37–27
- Pittsburgh – (2:13) Lonnell Dewalt 5-yard pass from Bernard Morris (Paul Edinger kick), Philadelphia 37–34

4th quarter

- Philadelphia – (14:54) Donovan Morgan 3-yard pass from Justin Allgood (James Paul kick), Philadelphia 44–34
- Pittsburgh – (11:08) Joshua Rue 1-yard run (Paul Edinger kick), Philadelphia 44–41
- Philadelphia – (5:55) Donovan Morgan 17-yard pass from Justin Allgood (James Paul kick failed), Philadelphia 50–41
- Pittsburgh – (0:53) Jason Willis 7-yard pass from Bernard Morris (Lonnell Dewalt pass), Philadelphia 50–49
- Philadelphia – (0:12) Team safety, Philadelphia 52–49
- Pittsburgh – (0:00) Paul Edinger 35-yard field goal, Tied 52–52

Overtime –

- Philadelphia – Mike Brown 15-yard interception return, Philadelphia 58–52

Passing

- Philadelphia – Justin Allgood: 25/36, 300 yards, 5 TD
- Pittsburgh – Bernard Morris: 24/37, 264 yards, 5 TD, 3 INT

Rushing

- Philadelphia – Donovan Morgan: 1 att, 2 yards, 1 TD
- Pittsburgh – Joshua Rue: 3 att, 8 yards, 2 TD

Receiving

- Philadelphia – Donovan Morgan: 14 rec, 189 yards, 5 TD
- Pittsburgh – Michael Washington: 9 rec, 111 yards, 1 TD

=== Week 2: at Chicago Rush ===
Week 2: Philadelphia Soul at Chicago Rush – Game summary

Quarter	1	2	3	4	Total
Soul	7	7	7	7	28
Rush	21	19	8	14	62

at Allstate Arena, Rosemont, Illinois

- Date: March 18
- Game time: 8:00 p.m. EDT
- Game attendance: 10,582
- Recap

Game information

1st quarter

- Philadelphia – (14:14) Syvelle Newton 34-yard pass from Justin Allgood (James Paul kick), Philadelphia 7–0
- Chicago – (10:23) Johnie Kirton 4-yard run (Chris Gould kick), Tied 7–7
- Chicago – (6:48) Mike Turkovich 6-yard pass from Russ Michna (Chris Gould kick), Chicago 14–7
- Chicago – (5:14) Marcus Waugh fumble return (Chris Gould kick), Chicago 21–7

2nd quarter

- Chicago – (10:08) Micah Rucker 9-yard pass from Russ Michna (Chris Gould kick), Chicago 28–7
- Chicago – (10:08) Perry Kyles 3-yard net recovery (Chris Gould kick failed), Chicago 34–7
- Chicago – (0:26) Johnie Kirton 1-yard run (Chris Gould kick blocked), Chicago 40–7
- Philadelphia – (0:00) Dominique Thompson 16-pass from Justin Allgood (James Paul kick), Chicago 40–14

3rd quarter

- Chicago – (5:27) Russ Michna 1-yard run (Vic Hall run), Chicago 48–14
- Philadelphia – (0:13) Ryan Vena 2-yard run (James Paul kick), Chicago 48–21

4th quarter

- Chicago – (12:42) Micah Rucker 8-yard pass from Russ Michna (Chris Gould kick), Chicago 55–21
- Philadelphia – (8:27) Ryan Vena 3-yard run (James Paul kick), Chicago 55–28
- Chicago – (1:00) Reggie Gray 14-yard pass from Dominic Randolph (Chris Gould kick), Chicago 62–21

Passing

- Philadelphia – Justin Allgood: 12/22, 165 yards, 2 TD, 3 INT
- Chicago – Russ Michna: 21/29, 189 yards, 3 TD, 1 INT

Rushing

- Philadelphia – Ryan Vena: 4 att, 9 yards, 2 TD
- Chicago – Johnie Kirton: 8 att, 16 yards, 2 TD

Receiving

- Philadelphia – Donovan Morgan: 9 rec, 115 yards
- Chicago – Micah Rucker: 11 rec, 83 yards, 2 TD

=== Week 4: at Milwaukee Mustangs ===
Week 4: Philadelphia Soul at Milwaukee Mustangs – Game summary

Quarter	1	2	3	4	Total
Soul	20	20	3	6	49
Mustangs	3	21	7	20	51

at Bradley Center, Milwaukee, Wisconsin

- Date: April 4
- Game time: 7:30 p.m. EDT
- Recap

Game information

1st quarter

- Philadelphia – (14:51) Brando Perkins 4-yard net recovery (James Paul kick), Philadelphia 7–0
- Philadelphia – (7:04) Alan Turner 11-yard pass from Justin Allgood (James Paul kick), Philadelphia 14–0
- Milwaukee – (4:05) Garrett Lindholm 20-yard field goal, Philadelphia 14–7
- Philadelphia – (2:56) Larry Brackins 22-yard pass from Justin Allgood (James Paul kick failed), Philadelphia 20–3

2nd quarter

- Milwaukee – (14:20) Ernest Smith 9-yard pass from R.J. Archer (Garrett Lindholm kick failed), Philadelphia 20–9
- Philadelphia – (11:09) Ryan Vena 1-yard run (James Paul kick), Philadelphia 27–9
- Philadelphia – (7:06) Larry Brackins 33-yard pass from Justin Allgood (James Paul kick), Philadelphia 34–9
- Milwaukee – (5:10) Ernest Smith 31-yard pass from R.J. Archer (Garrett Lindholm kick), Philadelphia 34–16
- Philadelphia – (1:19) Alan Turner 6-yard pass from Justin Allgood (James Paul kick failed), Philadelphia 40–16
- Milwaukee – (0:15) R.J. Archer 1-yard run (R.J. Archer pass), Philadelphia 40–24

3rd quarter

- Milwaukee – (7:47) Jason Onyebuagu 4-yard run (Garrett Lindholm kick), Philadelphia 40–31
- Philadelphia – (1:30) James Paul 25-yard field goal, Philadelphia 43–31

4th quarter

- Milwaukee – (14:25) R.J. Archer 1-yard run (Garrett Lindholm kick), Philadelphia 43–38
- Milwaukee – (3:45) Dwayne Eley Jr. 2-yard run (R.J. Archer pass failed), Milwaukee 44–43
- Philadelphia – (1:37) Jerome Hayes 47-yard fumble recovery (Justin Allgood pass failed), Philadelphia 49–44
- Milwaukee – (0:00) Dwayne Eley Jr. 2-yard pass from R.J. Archer (Garrett Lindholm kick), Milwaukee 51–49

Passing

- Philadelphia – Justin Allgood: 19/35, 287 yards, 4 TD, 2 INT
- Milwaukee – R.J. Archer: 26/41, 297 yards, 3 TD

Rushing

- Philadelphia – Ryan Vena: 1 att, 1 yard, 1 TD
- Milwaukee – R.J. Archer: 2 att, 2 yards, 2 TD

Receiving

- Philadelphia – Larry Brackins: 7 rec, 126 yards, 2 TD
- Milwaukee – Ernest Smith: 11 rec, 142 yards, 2 TD

=== Week 5: at Orlando Predators ===
Week 5: Philadelphia Soul at Orlando Predators – Game summary

Quarter	1	2	3	4	Total
Soul	14	13	7	12	46
Predators	12	6	14	21	53

at Amway Center, Orlando, Florida

- Date: April 9
- Game time: 7:30 p.m. EDT
- Referee: Joe Pester
- Recap

Game information

1st quarter

- Philadelphia – (13:00) Ryan Vena 32-yard run (Massimo Scaccia kick), Philadelphia 7–0
- Orlando – (6:57) T.T. Toliver 4-yard pass from Nick Hill (Mark Lewis kick failed), Philadelphia 7–6
- Philadelphia – (5:05) Larry Brackins 9-yard pass from Ryan Vena (Massimo Scaccia kick), Philadelphia 14–6
- Orlando – (0:44) Bobby Sippio 10-yard pass from Nick Hill (Mark Lewis kick failed), Philadelphia 14–12

2nd quarter

- Philadelphia – (12:21) Ryan Vena 6-yard run (Massimo Scaccia kick), Philadelphia 21–12
- Philadelphia – (9:13) Tanner Varner 36-yard interception return (Massimo Scaccia kick failed), Philadelphia 27–12
- Orlando – (3:36) Bobby Sippio 17-yard pass from Nick Hill (Nick Hill pass failed), Philadelphia 27–18

3rd quarter

- Orlando – (6:27) T.T. Toliver 11-yard pass from Collin Drafts (Mark Lewis kick), Philadelphia 27–25
- Philadelphia – (5:17) Donovan Morgan 42-yard pass from Ryan Vena (Massimo Scaccia kick), Philadelphia 34–25
- Orlando – (0:22) T.T. Toliver 7-yard pass from Nick Hill (Mark Lewis kick), Philadelphia 34–32

4th quarter

- Philadelphia – (12:18) Donovan Morgan 39-yard pass from Ryan Vena (Massimo Scaccia kick failed), Philadelphia 40–32
- Orlando – (8:36) Bobby Sippio 11-yard pass from Nick Hill (Mark Lewis kick), Philadelphia 40–39
- Orlando – (3:30) Bobby Sippio 6-yard pass from Nick Hill (Nick Hill pass failed), Orlando 45–40
- Philadelphia – (0:44) Donovan Morgan 24-yard pass from Ryan Vena (Ryan Vena pass failed), Philadelphia 46–45
- Orlando – (0:18) James Lynch 3-yard run (Nick Hill pass), Orlando 53–46

Passing

- Philadelphia – Ryan Vena: 16/26, 263 yards, 4 TD, 2 INT
- Orlando – Nick Hill: 28/40, 309 yards, 6 TD, 1 INT

Rushing

- Philadelphia – Ryan Vena: 3 att, 47 yards, 2 TD
- Orlando – James Lynch: 4 att, 17 yards, 1 TD

Receiving

- Philadelphia – Donovan Morgan: 7 rec, 156 yards, 3 TD
- Orlando – T.T. Toliver: 13 rec, 131 yards, 3 TD

=== Week 6: vs. Tampa Bay Storm ===
Week 6: Tampa Bay Storm at Philadelphia Soul – Game summary

Quarter	1	2	3	4	Total
Storm	13	13	0	25	51
Soul	14	14	13	7	48

at Wells Fargo Center, Philadelphia, Pennsylvania

- Date: April 15
- Game time: 8:00 p.m. EDT
- Game attendance: 12,893
- Referee: Kevin Stein
- Recap

Game information

1st quarter

- Philadelphia – (10:16) Ryan Vena 9-yard run (Massimo Scaccia kick), Philadelphia 7–0
- Tampa Bay – (5:58) Hank Edwards 3-yard pass from Grant Gregory (Kyle Chilton kick), Tied 7–7
- Philadelphia – (4:47) Donovan Morgan 37-yard pass from Ryan Vena (Massimo Scaccia kick), Philadelphia 14–7
- Tampa Bay – (2:18) Hank Edwards 6-yard pass from Grant Gregory (Kyle Chilton kick failed), Philadelphia 14–13

2nd quarter

- Philadelphia – (12:46) Ryan Vena 1-yard run (Massimo Scaccia kick), Philadelphia 21–13
- Tampa Bay – (1:33) Huey Whittaker 9-yard pass from Grant Gregory (Kyle Chilton kick), Philadelphia 21–20
- Philadelphia – (0:57) Tanner Varner 12-yard kickoff return (Massimo Scaccia kick), Philadelphia 28–20
- Tampa Bay – (0:16) Amarri Jackson 4-yard pass from Grant Gregory (Kyle Chilton kick blocked), Philadelphia 28–26

3rd quarter

- Philadelphia – (12:45) Syvelle Newton 16-yard pass from Ryan Vena (Massimo Scaccia kick), Philadelphia 35–26
- Philadelphia – (0:56) Donovan Morgan 11-yard pass from Ryan Vena (Massimo Scaccia kick failed), Philadelphia 41–26

4th quarter

- Tampa Bay – (13:32) Eric Ortiz 1-yard run (Grant Gregory pass), Philadelphia 41–34
- Tampa Bay – (8:35) Hank Edwards 4-yard pass from Grant Gregory (Kyle Chilton kick), Tied 41–41
- Tampa Bay – (2:43) Hank Edwards 4-yard pass from Grant Gregory (Kyle Chilton kick), Tampa Bay 48–41
- Philadelphia – (0:46) Syvelle Newton 33-yard pass from Ryan Vena (Massimo Scaccia kick), Tied 48–48
- Tampa Bay – (0:00) Kyle Chilton 30-yard field goal, Tampa Bay 51–48

Passing

- Tampa Bay – Grant Gregory: 23/29, 211 yards, 6 TD, 2 INT
- Philadelphia – Ryan Vena: 18/33, 225 yards, 4 TD, 1 INT

Rushing

- Tampa Bay – Grant Gregory: 2 att, 12 yards
- Philadelphia – Ryan Vena: 4 att, 15 yards, 2 TD

Receiving

- Tampa Bay – Hank Edwards: 10 rec, 74 yards, 4 TD
- Philadelphia – Syvelle Newton: 7 rec, 105 yards, 2 TD

=== Week 7: at San Jose SaberCats ===
Week 7: Philadelphia Soul at San Jose SaberCats – Game summary

Quarter	1	2	3	4	Total
Soul	7	13	7	34	61
SaberCats	14	17	14	23	68

at HP Pavilion at San Jose, San Jose, California

- Date: April 22
- Game time: 10:30 p.m. EDT
- Game attendance: 8,663
- Referee: David Cutaia
- Recap

Game information

1st quarter

- San Jose – (10:30) Chad Cook 4-yard run (Juan Gamboa kick), San Jose 7–0
- Philadelphia – (3:34) Donovan Morgan 3-yard pass from Justin Allgood (Massimo Scaccia kick), Tied 7–7
- San Jose – (1:29) Nichiren Flowers 27-yard pass from Mark Grieb (Juan Gamboa kick), San Jose 14–7

2nd quarter

- Philadelphia – (11:52) Daniel Ross 3-yard run (Massimo Scaccia kick failed), San Jose 14–13
- San Jose – (10:52) Chido Nwokocha 45-yard pass from Mark Grieb (Juan Gamboa kick), San Jose 21–13
- Philadelphia – (6:37) Keith Stokes 0-yard fumble recovery (Massimo Scaccia kick), San Jose 21–20
- San Jose – (1:55) Nichiren Flowers 1-yard run (Juan Gamboa kick), San Jose 28–20
- San Jose – (0:13) Juan Gamboa 38-yard field goal, San Jose 31–20

3rd quarter

- San Jose – (10:57) Nichiren Flowers 6-yard pass from Mark Grieb (Juan Gamboa kick), San Jose 38–20
- San Jose – (9:37) Jamario O'Neal 10-yard interception return (Juan Gamboa kick), San Jose 45–20
- Philadelphia – (1:57) Keith Stokes 11-yard pass from Ryan Vena (Massimo Scaccia kick), San Jose 45–27

4th quarter

- San Jose – (14:51) Chido Nwokocha 17-yard pass from Mark Grieb (Juan Gamboa kick), San Jose 52–27
- Philadelphia – (10:50) Syvelle Newton 5-yard pass from Ryan Vena (Massimo Scaccia kick), San Jose 52–34
- San Jose – (7:59) Chad Cook 3-yard run (Juan Gamboa kick), San Jose 59–34
- Philadelphia – (6:29) Donovan Morgan 45-yard pass from Ryan Vena (Massimo Scaccia kick), San Jose 59–41
- San Jose – (3:23) Juan Gamboa 16-yard field goal, San Jose 62–41
- Philadelphia – (2:03) Syvelle Newton 45-yard pass from Ryan Vena (Massimo Scaccia kick), San Jose 62–48
- Philadelphia – (0:47) Ryan Vena 4-yard run (Massimo Scaccia kick failed), San Jose 62–54
- San Jose – (0:19) Mark Grieb 4-yard run (Juan Gamboa kick failed), San Jose 69–54
- Philadelphia – (0:00) Keith Stokes 25-yard pass from Ryan Vena (Massimo Scaccia kick), San Jose 69–61

Passing

- Philadelphia – Ryan Vena: 12/16, 217 yards, 5 TD, 1 INT
- San Jose – Mark Grieb: 18/28, 221 yards, 4 TD, 1 INT

Rushing

- Philadelphia – Ryan Vena: 1 att, 4 yards, 1 TD
- San Jose – Chad Cook: 4 att, 11 yards, 2 TD

Receiving

- Philadelphia – Donovan Morgan: 11 rec, 163 yards, 2 TD
- San Jose – Chido Nwokocha: 5 rec, 75 yards, 2 TD

=== Week 8: at Iowa Barnstormers ===
Week 8: Philadelphia Soul at Iowa Barnstormers – Game summary

Quarter	1	2	3	4	Total
Soul	14	27	14	21	76
Barnstormers	6	21	13	22	62

at Wells Fargo Arena, Des Moines, Iowa

- Date: April 30
- Game time: 8:05 p.m. EDT
- Game attendance: 8,103
- Referee: Jeff Johnson
- Recap

Game information

1st quarter

- Iowa – (13:14) Todd Blythe 23-yard pass from Brad Banks (Kyle Schlicher kick failed), Iowa 6–0
- Philadelphia – (11:14) Keith Stokes 49-yard pass from Ryan Vena (Robbie Smith kick), Philadelphia 7–6
- Philadelphia – (0:23) Keith Stokes 14-yard pass from Ryan Vena (Robbie Smith kick), Philadelphia 14–6

2nd quarter

- Philadelphia – (12:23) Darnell Whiltey 2-yard run (Robbie Smith kick), Philadelphia 21–6
- Iowa – (8:00) Errick McCown 7-yard pass from Brad Banks (Kyle Schlicher kick), Philadelphia 21–13
- Philadelphia – (5:28) Ty Nsekle 17-yard pass from Ryan Vena (Robbie Smith kick), Philadelphia 28–13
- Iowa – (2:18) Todd Blythe 16-yard pass from Brad Banks (Kyle Schlicher kick), Philadelphia 28–20
- Philadelphia – (0:32) Donovan Morgan 24-yard pass from Ryan Vena (Robbie Smith kick failed), Philadelphia 34–20
- Iowa – (0:21) Jesse Schmidt 18-yard pass from Brad Banks (Kyle Schlicher kick), Philadelphia 34–27
- Philadelphia – (0:04) Syvelle Newton 10-yard pass from Ryan Vena (Robbie Smith kick), Philadelphia 41–27

3rd quarter

- Philadelphia – (13:53) Syvelle Newton 28-yard pass from Ryan Vena (Robbie Smith kick), Philadelphia 48–27
- Philadelphia – (12:38) Tanner Varner 8-yard interception return (Robbie Smith kick), Philadelphia 55–27
- Iowa – (10:55) Errick McCown 4-yard pass from Brad Banks (Kyle Schlicher kick failed), Philadelphia 55–33
- Iowa – (0:00) Todd Blythe 13-yard pass from Brad Banks (Kyle Schlicher kick), Philadelphia 55–40

4th quarter

- Philadelphia – (11:46) Keith Stokes 13-yard pass from Ryan Vena (Robbie Smith kick), Philadelphia 62–40
- Philadelphia – (8:31) Dejuan Alfonzo 39-yard interception return (Robbie Smith kick), Philadelphia 69–40
- Iowa – (6:06) Jesse Schmidt 16-yard pass from Brad Banks (Kyle Schlicher kick), Philadelphia 69–47
- Philadelphia – (4:37) Syvelle Newton 45-yard pass from Ryan Vena (Robbie Smith kick), Philadelphia 76–47
- Iowa – (1:11) Errick McCown 5-yard pass from Brad Banks (Kyle Schlicher kick), Philadelphia 76–54
- Iowa – (0:32) Todd Blythe 10-yard pass from Brad Banks (Brad Banks pass), Philadelphia 76–62

Passing

- Philadelphia – Ryan Vena: 20/30, 317 yards, 8 TD, 1 INT
- Iowa – Brad Banks: 33/43, 397 yards, 9 TD, 2 INT

Rushing

- Philadelphia – Darnell Whitley: 5 att, 10 yards, 1 TD
- Iowa – Brad Banks: 3 att, 17 yards

Receiving

- Philadelphia – Keith Stokes: 11 rec, 159 yards, 3 TD
- Iowa – Todd Blythe: 13 rec, 187 yards, 4 TD

=== Week 9: vs. Jacksonville Sharks ===
Week 9: Jacksonville Sharks at Philadelphia Soul – Game summary

Quarter	1	2	3	4	Total
Sharks	14	16	7	21	58
Soul	7	14	0	21	42

at Wells Fargo Center, Philadelphia, Pennsylvania

- Date: May 6
- Game time: 7:05 p.m. EDT
- Game attendance: 8,429
- Referee: Jim Corpora
- Recap

Game information

1st quarter

- Philadelphia – (8:29) Keith Stokes 28-yard pass from Ryan Vena (Robbie Smith kick), Philadelphia 7–0
- Jacksonville – (5:33) Jeron Harvey 20-yard pass from Aaron Garcia (Marco Capozzoli kick), Tied 7–7
- Jacksonville – (3:49) Jomo Wilson 29-yard pass from Aaron Garcia (Marco Capozzoli kick), Jacksonville 14–7

2nd quarter

- Jacksonville – (13:06) Jomo Wilson 8-yard pass from Aaron Garcia (Marco Capozzoli kick), Jacksonville 21–7
- Philadelphia – (11:21) Syvelle Newton 13-yard pass from Ryan Vena (Robbie Smith kick), Jacksonville 21–14
- Jacksonville – (1:13) Kirby Griffin 2-yard run (Marco Capozzoli rush fumbled), Jacksonville 27–14
- Philadelphia – (0:19) Donovan Morgan 7-yard pass from Ryan Vena (Robbie Smith kick), Jacksonville 27–21
- Jacksonville – (0:00) Marco Capozzoli 25-yard field goal, Jacksonville 30–21

3rd quarter

- Jacksonville – (3:16) Terrance Smith 41-yard interception return (Marco Capozzoli kick), Jacksonville 37–21

4th quarter

- Jacksonville – (9:56) Jeron Harvey 13-yard pass from Aaron Garcia (Marco Capozzoli kick), Jacksonville 44–21
- Philadelphia – (9:08) Keith Stokes 57-yard kickoff return (Robbie Smith kick), Jacksonville 44–28
- Jacksonville – (8:01) Jomo Wilson 4-yard pass from Aaron Garcia (Marco Capozzoli kick), Jacksonville 51–28
- Philadelphia – (5:26) Donovan Morgan 7-yard pass from Justin Allgood (Robbie Smith kick), Jacksonville 51–35
- Jacksonville – (4:04) Kirby Griffin 2-yard run (Marco Capozzoli kick), Jacksonville 58–35
- Philadelphia – (0:55) Larry Brackins 10-yard pass from Justin Allgood (Robbie Smith kick), Jacksonville 58–42

Passing

- Jacksonville – Aaron Garcia: 21/31, 271 yards, 5 TD
- Philadelphia – Justin Allgood: 8/15, 127 yards, 2 TD, 1 INT

Rushing

- Jacksonville – Kirby Griffin: 7 att, 12 yards, 2 TD
- Philadelphia – Darnell Whitley: 3 att, 7 yards

Receiving

- Jacksonville – Jomo Wilson: 11 rec, 148 yards, 3 TD
- Philadelphia – Donovan Morgan: 9 rec, 134 yards, 2 TD

=== Week 10: vs. Georgia Force ===
Week 10: Georgia Force at Philadelphia Soul – Game summary

Quarter	1	2	3	4	Total
Force	14	14	14	7	49
Soul	20	27	7	14	68

at Wells Fargo Center, Philadelphia, Pennsylvania

- Date: May 13
- Game time: 7:05 p.m. EDT
- Game attendance: 7,551
- Referee: Joe Pester
- Recap

Game information

1st quarter

- Philadelphia – (12:23) Syvelle Newton 38-yard pass from Ryan Vena (Robbie Smith kick blocked), Philadelphia 6–0
- Georgia – (9:53) Maurice Purify 1-yard pass from Brett Elliott (Carlos Martinez kick), Georgia 7–6
- Philadelphia – (6:52) Darnell Whitley 15-yard pass from Ryan Vena (Robbie Smith kick), Philadelphia 13–7
- Georgia – (3:02) Maurice Purify 12-yard pass from Brett Elliott (Carlos Martinez kick), Georgia 14–13
- Philadelphia – (1:02) Keith Stokes 11-yard pass from Ryan Vena (Robbie Smith kick), Philadelphia 20–14

2nd quarter

- Georgia – (8:31) Maurice Purify 9-yard pass from Brett Elliott (Carlos Martinez kick), Georgia 21–20
- Philadelphia – (6:04) Donovan Morgan 45-yard pass from Ryan Vena (Robbie Smith kick), Philadelphia 27–21
- Georgia – (3:59) Maurice Purify 2-yard pass from Larry Shipp (Carlos Martinez kick), Georgia 28–27
- Philadelphia – (2:17) Donovan Morgan 45-yard pass from Ryan Vena (Robbie Smith kick), Philadelphia 34–28
- Philadelphia – (0:56) Ryan Vena 1-yard run (Robbie Smith kick failed), Philadelphia 40–28
- Philadelphia – (0:40) Donovan Morgan 3-yard pass from Ryan Vena (Robbie Smith kick), Philadelphia 47–28

3rd quarter

- Georgia – (14:44) C.J. Johnson 56-yard kickoff return (Carlos Martinez kick), Philadelphia 47–35
- Philadelphia – (8:46) Damian Walker 5-yard run (Robbie Smith kick), Philadelphia 54–35
- Georgia – (3:05) Maurice Purify 9-yard pass from Brett Elliott (Carlos Martinez kick), Philadelphia 54–42

4th quarter

- Philadelphia – (11:53) Ryan Vena 1-yard run (Robbie Smith kick), Philadelphia 61–42
- Philadelphia – (5:13) Donovan Morgan 35-yard pass from Ryan Vena (Robbie Smith kick), Philadelphia 68–42
- Georgia – (1:16) C.J. Johnson 44-yard pass from Brett Elliott (Carlos Martinez kick), Philadelphia 68–49

Passing

- Georgia – Brett Elliott: 21/44, 301 yards, 5 TD, 3 INT
- Philadelphia – Ryan Vena: 20/28, 320 yards, 7 TD, 3 INT

Rushing

- Georgia – Brett Elliott: 2 att, 2 yards
- Philadelphia – Damian Walker: 1 att, 5 yards, 1 TD

Receiving

- Georgia – Maurice Purify: 10 rec, 92 yards, 5 TD
- Philadelphia – Donovan Morgan: 5 rec, 135 yards, 4 TD

=== Week 11: at Cleveland Gladiators ===
Week 11: Philadelphia Soul at Cleveland Gladiators – Game summary

Quarter	1	2	3	4	Total
Soul	6	14	7	14	41
Gladiators	7	16	22	14	59

at Quicken Loans Arena, Cleveland, Ohio

- Date: May 21
- Game time: 7:00 p.m. EDT
- Game attendance: 7,979
- Referee: Tony Cannella
- Recap

Game information

1st quarter

- Cleveland – (8:46) Robert Redd 18-yard pass from Kurt Rocco (Matt Denny kick), Cleveland 7–0
- Philadelphia – (5:13) Syvelle Newton 10-yard pass from Ryan Vena (Robbie Smith kick failed), Cleveland 7–6

2nd quarter

- Cleveland – (14:53) Robert Redd 15-yard pass from Kurt Rocco (Matt Denny kick), Cleveland 14–6
- Cleveland – (13:27) Anthony Hoke safety, Cleveland 16–6
- Cleveland – (11:40) Adam Tadisch 15-yard pass from Kurt Rocco (Matt Denny kick), Cleveland 23–6
- Philadelphia – (8:55) Donovan Morgan 10-yard pass from Ryan Vena (Robbie Smith kick), Cleveland 23–13
- Philadelphia – (0:02) Syvelle Newton 5-yard pass from Ryan Vena (Robbie Smith kick), Cleveland 23–20

3rd quarter

- Cleveland – (9:22) Russell Monk 3-yard run (Matt Denny kick), Cleveland 30–20
- Cleveland – (8:31) Drew Berube safety, Cleveland 32–20
- Cleveland – (7:52) Thyron Lewis 10-yard pass from Kurt Rocco (Matt Denny kick), Cleveland 39–20
- Philadelphia – (6:45) Donovan Morgan 33-yard pass from Ryan Vena (Robbie Smith kick), Cleveland 39–27
- Cleveland – (2:37) Robert Redd 7-yard pass from Kurt Rocco (Dan Whalen rush failed), Cleveland 45–27

4th quarter

- Philadelphia – (12:38) Donovan Morgan 40-yard pass from Ryan Vena (Robbie Smith kick), Cleveland 45–34
- Cleveland – (10:02) Dominick Goodman 5-yard pass from Kurt Rocco (Matt Denny kick), Cleveland 52–34
- Philadelphia – (5:24) Donovan Morgan 7-yard pass from Ryan Vena (Robbie Smith kick), Cleveland 52–41
- Cleveland – (4:31) Robert Redd 12-yard pass from Kurt Rocco (Matt Denny kick), Cleveland 59–41

Passing

- Philadelphia – Ryan Vena: 20/31, 249 yards, 6 TD, 1 INT
- Cleveland – Kurt Rocco: 18/29, 233 yards, 7 TD

Rushing

- Philadelphia – Ryan Vena: 1 att, 2 yards
- Cleveland – Troy Bergeron: 1 att, 11 yards

Receiving

- Philadelphia – Donovan Morgan: 9 rec, 132 yards, 4 TD
- Cleveland – Robert Redd: 8 rec, 113 yards, 4 TD

=== Week 12: vs. New Orleans VooDoo ===
Week 12: New Orleans VooDoo at Philadelphia Soul – Game summary

Quarter	1	2	3	4	Total
VooDoo	6	17	20	6	49
Soul	7	34	14	15	70

at Wells Fargo Center, Philadelphia, Pennsylvania

- Date: May 27
- Game time: 7:05 p.m. EDT
- Game attendance: 7,626
- Referee: Tom McCabe
- Recap

Game information

1st quarter

- New Orleans – (14:23) Matt Jackson 16-yard interception return (Jonathan Ruffin kick failed), New Orleans 6–0
- Philadelphia – (5:13) Darnell Whitley 6-yard run (Jon Striefsky kick), Philadelphia 7–6

2nd quarter

- Philadelphia – (14:56) Ryan Vena 2-yard run (Jon Striefsky kick), Philadelphia 14–6
- New Orleans – (11:33) Jonathan Ruffin 46-yard field goal, Philadelphia 14–9
- Philadelphia – (9:26) Larry Brackins 7-yard pass from Ryan Vena (Jon Striefsky kick), Philadelphia 21–9
- New Orleans – (5:22) P.J. Berry 13-yard pass from D. Bryant (Jonathan Ruffin kick), Philadelphia 21–16
- Philadelphia – (2:49) Syvelle Newton 6-yard pass from Ryan Vena (Jon Striefsky kick), Philadelphia 28–16
- Philadelphia – (0:38) Syvelle Newton 1-yard run (Jon Striefsky kick), Philadelphia 35–16
- New Orleans – (0:31) P.J. Berry 55-yard kickoff return (Jonathan Ruffin kick), Philadelphia 35–23
- Philadelphia – (0:09) Darnell Whitley 1-yard run (Jon Striefsky kick failed), Philadelphia 41–23

3rd quarter

- New Orleans – (12:26) Alvin Jackson 10-yard interception return (Danny Wimprine rush failed), Philadelphia 41–29
- Philadelphia – (9:01) Donovan Morgan 15-yard pass from Ryan Vena (Jon Striefsky kick), Philadelphia 48–29
- New Orleans – (7:43) Hutch Gonzales 10-yard pass from D. Bryant (Jonathan Ruffin kick), Philadelphia 48–36
- Philadelphia – (5:49) Donovan Morgan 15-yard pass from Ryan Vena (Jon Striefsky kick), Philadelphia 55–36
- New Orleans – (2:50) P.J. Berry 9-yard pass from D. Bryant (Jonathan Ruffin kick), Philadelphia 55–43

4th quarter

- Philadelphia – (11:12) Donovan Morgan 5 yd pass from Ryan Vena (Jon Striefsky kick), Philadelphia 62–43
- Philadelphia – (9:03) Team safety, Philadelphia 64–43
- Philadelphia – (4:16) Syvelle Newton 4-yard pass from Ryan Vena (Jon Striefsky kick failed), Philadelphia 70–43
- New Orleans – (0:50) Tom Taggert 3-yard run (Jonathan Ruffin kick failed), Philadelphia 70–49

Passing

- New Orleans – D. Bryant: 14/26, 157 yards, 3 TD, 2 INT
- Philadelphia – Ryan Vena: 22/33, 291 yards, 6 TD, 2 INT

Rushing

- New Orleans – Tom Taggert: 1 att, 2 yards, 1 TD
- Philadelphia – Darnell Whitley: 8 att, 20 yards, 2 TD

Receiving

- New Orleans – P.J. Berry: 6 rec, 70 yards, 2 TD
- Philadelphia – Donovan Morgan: 8 rec, 117 yards, 3 TD

=== Week 13: vs. Milwaukee Mustangs ===
Week 13: Milwaukee Mustangs at Philadelphia Soul – Game summary

Quarter	1	2	3	4	Total
Iron	0	10	13	14	37
Soul	0	14	6	19	39

at Wells Fargo Center, Philadelphia, Pennsylvania

- Date: June 3
- Game time: 7:05 p.m. EDT
- Game attendance: 7,681
- Referee: Jim Corpora
- Recap

Game information

1st quarter

No scoring

2nd quarter

- Philadelphia – (12:13) Brandon Perkins 0-yard fumble recovery (Jon Striefsky kick), Philadelphia 7–0
- Milwaukee – (6:51) Damian Harrell 25-yard pass from R.J. Archer (Garrett Lindholm kick), Tied 7–7
- Philadelphia – (0:55) Syvelle Newton 13-yard pass from Ryan Vena (Jon Striefsky kick), Philadelphia 14–7
- Milwaukee – (0:00) Garrett Lindholm 22-yard field goal, Philadelphia 14–10

3rd quarter

- Milwaukee – Mykel Benson 1-yard run (Garrett Lindholm kick), Milwaukee 17–14
- Philadelphia – (6:26) Larry Brackins 5-yard pass from Ryan Vena (Jon Striefsky kick failed), Philadelphia 20–17
- Milwaukee – (0:23) Mykel Benson 2-yard run (Garrett Lindholm kick failed), Milwaukee 23–20

4th quarter

- Philadelphia – (11:41) Donovan Morgan 20-yard pass from Ryan Vena (Jon Striefsky kick), Philadelphia 27–23
- Milwaukee – (2:46) Marcus Everett 3-yard run (Garrett Lindholm kick), Milwaukee 30–27
- Philadelphia – (1:01) Donovan Morgan 43-yard pass from Ryan Vena, Philadelphia 33–30
- Milwaukee – (0:55) Mykel Benson 4-yard run (Garrett Lindholm kick), Milwaukee 37–33
- Philadelphia – (0:00) Donovan Morgan 4-yard pass from Ryan Vena (Ryan Vena rush failed), Philadelphia 39–37

Passing

- Milwaukee – R.J. Archer: 21/37, 188 yards, 1 TD, 1 INT
- Philadelphia – Ryan Vena: 19/31, 214 yards, 5 TD, 2 INT

Rushing

- Milwaukee – Mykel Benson: 8 att, 18 yards, 3 TD
- Philadelphia – Ryan Vena: 5 att, 11 yards

Receiving

- Milwaukee – Brent Holmes: 9 rec, 89 yards
- Philadelphia – Donovan Morgan: 7 rec, 110 yards, 3 TD

=== Week 14: at Spokane Shock ===
Week 14: Philadelphia Soul at Spokane Shock – Game summary

Quarter	1	2	3	4	Total
Soul	7	21	6	20	54
Shock	27	7	14	27	75

at Spokane Veterans Memorial Arena, Spokane, Washington

- Date: June 10
- Game time: 8:00 p.m. EDT
- Game attendance: 8,972
- Referee: Shawn Hochuli
- Recap

Game information

1st quarter

- Spokane – (11:50) Markee White 1-yard pass from Erik Meyer (Taylor Rowan kick), Spokane 7–0
- Spokane – (10:24) Greg Orton 39-yard pass from Erik Meyer (Taylor Rowan kick), Spokane 14–0
- Spokane – (8:45) Markee White 15-yard pass from Erik Meyer (Taylor Rowan kick failed), Spokane 20–0
- Philadelphia – (7:28) Donovan Morgan 45-yard pass from Ryan Vena (Robbie Smith kick), Spokane 20–7
- Spokane – (5:11) Adron Tennell 26-yard pass from Erik Meyer (Taylor Rowan kick), Spokane 27–7

2nd quarter

- Philadelphia – (11:54) Donovan Morgan 13-yard pass from Ryan Vena (Robbie Smith kick), Spokane 27–14
- Spokane – (4:17) Ben Ossai 5-yard pass from Erik Meyer (Taylor Rowan kick), Spokane 34–14
- Philadelphia – (3:23) Keith Stokes 56-yard kickoff return (Robbie Smith kick), Spokane 34–21
- Philadelphia – (0:55) Donovan Morgan 5-yard pass from Ryan Vena (Robbie Smith kick), Spokane 34–28

3rd quarter

- Philadelphia – (12:49) Larry Brackins 15-yard pass from Ryan Vena (Robbie Smith kick failed), Tied 34–34
- Spokane – (6:42) Antwan Marsh 3-yard run (Taylor Rowan kick), Spokane 41–34
- Spokane – (0:00) Beau Bell 19-yard interception return (Taylor Rowan kick), Spokane 48–34

4th quarter

- Spokane – (14:43) Ruschard Dodd-Masters 14-yard interception return (ROWAN, Taylor kick), Spokane 55–34
- Philadelphia – (13:02) Syvelle Newton 28-yard pass from Ryan Vena (Robbie Smith kick failed), Spokane 55–40
- Spokane – (12:00) Markee White 9-yard pass from Erik Meyer (Taylor Rowan kick failed), Spokane 61–40
- Philadelphia – (9:42) Ryan Vena 2-yard run (Robbie Smith kick), Spokane 61–47
- Spokane – (4:05) Antwan Marsh 2-yard run (Taylor Rowan kick), Spokane 68–47
- Philadelphia – (0:44) Ryan Vena 2-yard run (Robbie Smith kick), Spokane 68–54
- Spokane – (0:24) Greg Orton 28-yard pass from Erik Meyer (Taylor Rowan kick), Spokane 75–54

Passing

- Philadelphia – Ryan Vena: 23/41, 300 yards, 5 TD, 3 INT
- Spokane – Erik Meyer: 26/36, 332 yards, 7 TD, 1 INT

Rushing

- Philadelphia – Ryan Vena: 3 att, 8 yards, 2 TD
- Spokane – Antwan Marsh: 2 att, 5 yards, 2 TD

Receiving

- Philadelphia – Syvelle Newton: 10 rec, 131 yards, 1 TD
- Spokane – Greg Orton: 10 rec, 151 yards, 2 TD

=== Week 15: vs. Tulsa Talons ===
Week 15: Tulsa Talons at Philadelphia Soul – Game summary

Quarter	1	2	3	4	Total
Talons	6	21	7	14	48
Soul	7	7	14	14	42

at Wells Fargo Center, Philadelphia, Pennsylvania

- Date: June 17
- Game time: 7:05 p.m. EDT
- Game attendance: 8,140
- Referee: Jim Corpora
- Recap

Game information

1st quarter

- Philadelphia – (12:17) Mike Brown 36-yard pass from Brandon Kirsch (Jon Striefsky kick), Philadelphia 7–0
- Tulsa – (6:38) Al Hunt 4-yard pass from Justin Allgood (Juan Bongarra kick failed), Philadelphia 7–6

2nd quarter

- Tulsa – (7:10) J.C. Neal 50-yard interception return (Juan Bongarra kick), Tulsa 13–7
- Tulsa – (3:41) Al Hunt 6-yard pass from Justin Allgood (Juan Bongarra kick), Tulsa 20–7
- Philadelphia – (0:38) Mike Brown 29-yard pass from Brandon Kirsch (Jon Striefsky kick), Tulsa 20–14
- Tulsa – (0:22) Troy McBroom 42-yard pass from Justin Allgood (Juan Bongarra kick), Tulsa 27–14

3rd quarter

- Philadelphia – (11:20) Syvelle Newton 19-yard pass from Ryan Vena (Jon Striefsky kick), Tulsa 27–21
- Tulsa – (7:05) Troy McBroom 31-yard pass from Justin Allgood (Juan Bongarra kick), Tulsa 34–21
- Philadelphia – (1:44) Syvelle Newton 5-yard pass from Ryan Vena (Jon Striefsky kick), Tulsa 34–28

4th quarter

- Tulsa – (12:41) Troy McBroom 8-yard pass from Justin Allgood (Juan Bongarra kick), Tulsa 41–28
- Philadelphia – (7:25) Syvelle Newton 27-yard pass from Ryan Vena (Jon Striefsky kick), Tulsa 41–35
- Tulsa – (3:32) Brandon Copeland 26-yard pass from Justin Allgood (Juan Bongarra kick), Tulsa 48–35
- Philadelphia – (0:53) Syvelle Newton 31-yard pass from Ryan Vena (Jon Striefsky kick), Tulsa 48–42

Passing

- Tulsa – Justin Allgood: 26/42, 283 yards, 6 TD
- Philadelphia – Brandon Kirsch: 14/25, 180 yards, 2 TD, 3 INT

Rushing

- Tulsa – J.J. Payne: 2 att, 9 yards
- Philadelphia – Brandon Kirsch: 1 att, 0 yards

Receiving

- Tulsa – Troy McBroom: 10 rec, 152 yards, 3 TD
- Philadelphia – Syvelle Newton: 11 rec, 160 yards, 4 TD

=== Week 16: vs. Arizona Rattlers ===
Week 16: Arizona Rattlers at Philadelphia Soul – Game summary

Quarter	1	2	3	4	Total
Rattlers	7	20	7	21	55
Soul	14	20	13	7	54

at Wells Fargo Center, Philadelphia, Pennsylvania

- Date: June 25
- Game time: 7:05 p.m. EDT
- Game attendance: 9,710
- Referee: Larry Smith
- Recap

Game information

1st quarter

- Arizona – (12:04) Rod Windsor 7-yard pass from Nick Davila (Fabrizio Scaccia kick), Arizona 7–0
- Philadelphia – (9:24) Donovan Morgan 33-yard pass from Ryan Vena (Jon Striefsky kick), Tied 7–7
- Philadelphia – (1:16) Ryan Vena 3-yard run (Jon Striefsky kick), Philadelphia 14–7

2nd quarter

- Arizona – (13:10) Jason Geathers 14-yard pass from Nick Davila (Fabrizio Scaccia kick failed), Philadelphia 14–13
- Philadelphia – (9:11) Larry Brackins 11-yard pass from Ryan Vena (Jon Striefsky kick), Philadelphia 21–13
- Philadelphia – (4:57) Ryan Vena 1-yard run (Jon Striefsky kick failed), Philadelphia 27–13
- Arizona – (0:56) Rod Windsor 4-yard pass from Nick Davila (Fabrizio Scaccia kick), Philadelphia 27–20
- Philadelphia – (0:45) Darnell Whitley 5-yard run (Jon Striefsky kick), Philadelphia 34–20
- Arizona – (0:05) Jason Geathers 4-yard pass from Nick Davila (Fabrizio Scaccia kick), Philadelphia 34–27

3rd quarter

- Philadelphia – (7:29) Darnell Whitley 4-yard run (Jon Striefsky kick), Philadelphia 41–27
- Arizona – (4:43) Jason Geathers 1-yard run (Fabrizio Scaccia kick), Philadelphia 41–34
- Philadelphia – (2:02) Ryan Vena 1-yard run (Jon Striefsky kick failed), Philadelphia 47–34

4th quarter

- Arizona – (11:09) Jason Geathers 2-yard pass from Nick Davila (Fabrizio Scaccia kick), Philadelphia 47–41
- Philadelphia – (6:23) Ryan Vena 7-yard run (Jon Striefsky kick), Philadelphia 54–41
- Arizona – (5:04) Rod Windsor 44-yard pass from Nick Davila (Fabrizio Scaccia kick), Philadelphia 54–48
- Arizona – (0:06) John Booker 1-yard pass from Nick Davila (Fabrizio Scaccia kick), Arizona 55–54

Passing

- Arizona – Nick Davila: 28/42, 320 yards, 7 TD, 2 INT
- Philadelphia – Ryan Vena: 18/32, 226 yards, 2 TD

Rushing

- Arizona – Jason Geathers: 3 att, 6 yards, 1 TD
- Philadelphia – Ryan Vena: 8 att, 18 yards, 4 TD

Receiving

- Arizona – Rod Windsor: 11 rec, 131 yards, 3 TD
- Philadelphia – Donovan Morgan: 5 rec, 98 yards, 1 TD

=== Week 17: at Dallas Vigilantes ===
Week 17: Philadelphia Soul at Dallas Vigilantes – Game summary

Quarter	1	2	3	4	Total
Soul	14	6	14	7	41
Vigilantes	20	14	17	7	58

at American Airlines Center, Dallas, Texas

- Date: July 2
- Game time: 8:30 p.m. EDT
- Game attendance: 8,957
- Referee: Chris Snead
- Recap

Game information

1st quarter

- Dallas – (12:35) Derrick Ross 2-yard run (Remy Hamilton kick), Dallas 7–0
- Dallas – (10:02) DeAndrew Rubin 31-yard pass from Dan Raudabaugh (Remy Hamilton kick failed), Dallas 13–0
- Philadelphia – (5:37) Syvelle Newton 12-yard pass from Ryan Vena (Jon Striefsky kick), Dallas 13–7
- Dallas – (4:30) Chris LeFlore 54-yard kickoff return (Remy Hamilton kick), Dallas 20–7
- Philadelphia – (0:11) Ty Nsekle 16-yard pass from Syvelle Newton (Jon Striefsky kick), Dallas 20–14

2nd quarter

- Dallas – (12:17) Jason Harmon 26-yard interception return (Remy Hamilton kick), Dallas 27–14
- Philadelphia – (4:09) Larry Brackins 6-yard pass from Ryan Vena (Jon Striefsky kick failed), Dallas 27–20
- Dallas – (1:17) Derrick Ross 2-yard run (Remy Hamilton kick), Dallas 34–20

3rd quarter

- Dallas – (12:30) Derrick Ross 2-yard run (Remy Hamilton kick), Dallas 41–20
- Philadelphia – (9:47) Donovan Morgan 6-yard pass from Ryan Vena (Jon Striefsky kick), Dallas 41–27
- Dallas – (4:47) Remy Hamilton 19-yard field goal, Dallas 44–27
- Philadelphia – (2:28) Donovan Morgan 27-yard pass from Ryan Vena (Jon Striefsky kick), Dallas 44–34
- Dallas – (0:47) Anthony Jones 10-yard pass from Dan Raudabaugh (Remy Hamilton kick), Dallas 51–34

4th quarter

- Dallas – (9:44) Matt Fields 28-yard pass from Dan Raudabaugh (Remy Hamilton kick), Dallas 58–34
- Philadelphia – (8:16) Donovan Morgan 29-yard pass from Ryan Vena (Jon Striefsky kick), Dallas 58–41

Passing

- Philadelphia – Ryan Vena: 22/38, 354 yards, 5 TD, 3 INT
- Dallas – Dan Raudabaugh: 20/29, 253 yards, 3 TD, 1 INT

Rushing

- Philadelphia – No attempts
- Dallas – Derrick Ross: 10 att, 26 yards, 3 TD

Receiving

- Philadelphia – Donovan Morgan: 8 rec, 135 yards, 3 TD
- Dallas – Anthony Jones: 9 rec, 115 yards, 1 TD

=== Week 18: vs. Cleveland Gladiators ===
Week 18: Cleveland Gladiators at Philadelphia Soul – Game summary

Quarter	1	2	3	4	Total
Gladiators	7	0	7	7	21
Soul	14	13	15	7	49

at Wells Fargo Center, Philadelphia, Pennsylvania

- Date: July 8
- Game time: 8:00 p.m. EDT
- Game attendance: 9,761
- Referee: Jim Corpora
- Recap

Game information

1st quarter

- Philadelphia – (11:58) Larry Brackins 15-yard pass from Ryan Vena (Jon Striefsky kick), Philadelphia 7–0
- Philadelphia – (5:30) Larry Brackins 4-yard pass from Ryan Vena (Jon Striefsky kick), Philadelphia 14–0
- Cleveland – (3:35) Troy Bergeron 32-yard pass from Kurt Rocco (Matt Denny kick), Philadelphia 14–7

2nd quarter

- Philadelphia – (12:45) Jon Striefsky 20-yard field goal, Philadelphia 17–7
- Philadelphia – (3:58) Syvelle Newton 3-yard run (Jon Striefsky kick), Philadelphia 24–7
- Philadelphia – (0:00) Jon Striefsky 19-yard field goal, Philadelphia 27–7

3rd quarter

- Philadelphia – (11:52) Larry Brackins 17-yard pass from Ryan Vena (Jon Striefsky kick), Philadelphia 34–7
- Philadelphia – (9:03) Dustin Barno safety, Philadelphia 36–7
- Cleveland – (1:00) Kurt Rocco 1-yard run (Matt Denny kick), Philadelphia 36–14
- Philadelphia – (0:06) Ryan Vena 4-yard run (Jon Striefsky kick blocked), Philadelphia 42–14

4th quarter

- Philadelphia – (7:05) Ryan Vena 10-yard run (Jon Striefsky kick), Philadelphia 49–14
- Cleveland – (2:52) Troy Bergeron 11-yard pass from Kurt Rocco (Matt Denny kick), Philadelphia 49–21

Passing

- Cleveland – Kurt Rocco: 19/33, 201 yards, 2 TD, 2 INT
- Philadelphia – Ryan Vena: 21/31, 245 yards, 3 TD, 1 INT

Rushing

- Cleveland – Kurt Rocco: 5 att, 11 yards, 1 TD
- Philadelphia – Ryan Vena: 5 att, 30 yards, 2 TD

Receiving

- Cleveland – Troy Bergeron: 4 rec, 67 yards, 2 TD
- Philadelphia – Larry Brackins: 9 rec, 133 yards, 3 TD

=== Week 20: vs. Pittsburgh Power ===
Week 20: Pittsburgh Power at Philadelphia Soul – Game summary

Quarter	1	2	3	4	Total
Power	7	20	13	21	61
Soul	14	7	7	20	48

at Wells Fargo Center, Philadelphia, Pennsylvania

- Date: July 22
- Game time: 7:05 p.m. EDT
- Game attendance: 16,429
- Referee: Scott Vaughn
- Recap

Game information

1st quarter

- Philadelphia – (9:05) Donovan Morgan 18-yard pass from Ryan Vena (Jon Striefsky kick), Philadelphia 7–0
- Pittsburgh – (4:17) Michael Washington 8-yard pass from Bill Stull (Paul Edinger kick), Tied 7–7
- Philadelphia – (1:39) Darnell Whitley 9-yard run (Jon Striefsky kick), Philadelphia 14–7

2nd quarter

- Pittsburgh – (12:16) Charleston Gray 4-yard run (Paul Edinger kick blocked), Philadelphia 14–13
- Philadelphia – (6:41) Syvelle Newton 0-yard fumble recovery (Jon Striefsky kick), Philadelphia 21–13
- Pittsburgh – (3:21) Lonnell DeWalt 9-yard pass from Bill Stull (Paul Edinger kick), Philadelphia 21–20
- Pittsburgh – (1:32) Eddie Thompson 2-yard run (Paul Edinger kick), Pittsburgh 27–21

3rd quarter

- Pittsburgh – (12:31) Michael Washington 28-yard pass from Bill Stull (Paul Edinger kick), Pittsburgh 34–21
- Philadelphia – (9:47) Syvelle Newton 3-yard run (Jon Striefsky kick), Pittsburgh 34–28
- Pittsburgh – (0:03) Michael Washington 10-yard pass from Bill Stull (Paul Edinger kick failed), Pittsburgh 40–28

4th quarter

- Philadelphia – (11:41) Darnell Whitley 2-yard run (Jon Striefsky kick), Pittsburgh 40–35
- Pittsburgh – (6:10) Bernard Morris 21-yard pass from Bill Stull (Paul Edinger kick), Pittsburgh 47–35
- Philadelphia – (2:25) Ty Nsekle 4-yard pass from Ryan Vena (Jon Striefsky kick), Pittsburgh 47–42
- Pittsburgh – (0:48) Michael Washington 8-yard pass from Bill Stull (Paul Edinger kick), Pittsburgh 54–42
- Philadelphia – (0:14) Larry Brackins 15-yard pass from Ryan Vena (Jon Striefsky kick failed), Pittsburgh 54–48
- Pittsburgh – (0:10) Jason Willis 9-yard kickoff return (Paul Edinger kick), Pittsburgh 61–48

Passing

- Pittsburgh – Bill Stull: 24/40, 260 yards, 6 TD
- Philadelphia – Ryan Vena: 19/34, 267 yards, 3 TD, 1 INT

Rushing

- Pittsburgh – Eddie Thompson: 1 att, 2 yards, 1 TD
- Philadelphia – Darnell Whitley: 3 att, 13 yards, 2 TD

Receiving

- Pittsburgh – Michael Washington: 11 rec, 155 yards, 4 TD
- Philadelphia – Donovan Morgan: 6 rec, 112 yards, 1 TD
