= Lawrence Brown =

Lawrence Brown or Laurence Brown may refer to:

- Lawrence Benjamin Brown (1893–1972), American pianist, composer, and arranger of African-American folk songs
- Lawrence Brown (jazz trombonist) (1907–1988), American jazz trombonist
- Laurie Brown (bishop) (1907–1993), Bishop of Birmingham, 1969–1977
- Lawrence Michael Brown (born 1936), British material scientist
- Dobie Gray (Lawrence Darrow Brown, 1940–2011), American singer and songwriter
- Lawrence D. Brown (1940–2018), American professor of statistics at the University of Pennsylvania
- Lawrence G. Brown (born 1943), American professor of mathematics at Purdue University

== See also ==
- Lawrence Brown House, historic home in Bartow, Florida, USA
- Lawrence Brown Aircraft Co. (1926–1945), American aircraft manufacturer
- Lawrence, Brown County, Wisconsin, USA
- Larry Brown (disambiguation)
- Laurie Brown (disambiguation)
