= Conor Reilly =

American football player and coach (born 1986)

Connor Reilly
Profile
- Position: Defensive lineman

Personal information
- Born: August 20, 1986 (age 40)
- Listed height: 6 ft 2 in (1.88 m)
- Listed weight: 255 lb (116 kg)

Career information
- College: Ohio
- NFL draft: 2010: undrafted

Career history

Playing
- Cleveland Gladiators (2011); Iowa Barnstormers (2011)*
- * Offseason or practice squad member only

Coaching
- Wooster Fighting Scots (2013) (Assistant)

Career Arena football statistics
- Tackles: 7.5
- Quarterback sacks: 0
- Fumbles recovered: 1
- Stats at ArenaFan.com

Conor Reilly (born August 20, 1986) is an American former football defensive end for the Iowa Barnstormers and Cleveland Gladiators of the Arena Football League. He played college football at Ohio University.

== Early life ==
Reilly earned All-Ohio honors at Defensive End in 2004.

== College career ==
Reilly played for the Ohio Bobcats from 2006 to 2009. He was redshirted in 2005.

== Professional career ==
=== Iowa Barnstormers ===
Reilly was signed by the Iowa Barnstormers on October 28, 2010. He was released by the Barnstormers on March 7, 2011

=== Cleveland Gladiators ===
Reilly signed with the Cleveland Gladiators on April 26, 2011. He appeared in 11 games for the Gladiators.

== Coaching career ==
Reilly has served as an assistant coach at the College of Wooster.
