= Larry Poncho Brown =

American artist

Larry "Poncho" Brown
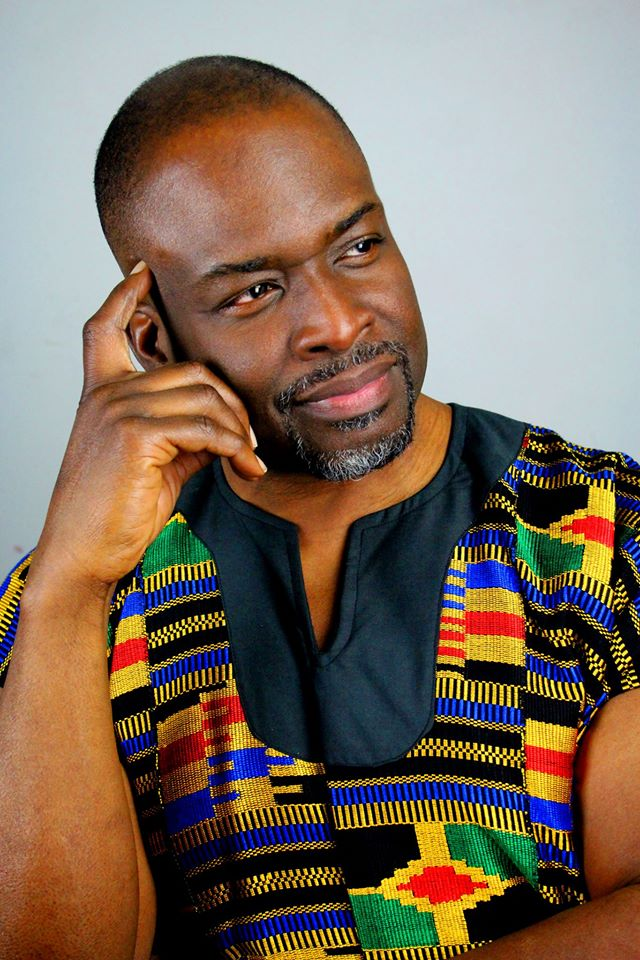
- Born: Larry O'Neill Brown, Jr. December 19, 1962 (age 63)
- Education: Maryland Institute College of Art (BFA)
- Occupation: Artist
- Parent(s): Diretha V. Hall Brown (mother); Larry O'Neill Brown, Sr. (father)

Larry "Poncho" Brown (born December 19, 1962) is an American artist, who began as a sign painter professionally, and has worked in both painting and sculpture. He has also worked as a curator. His work has been shown in exhibitions, television series, and multi-disciplinary art pieces.

== Early life ==
Larry Brown was born Larry O'Neill Brown, Jr. on December 19, 1962. He received the nickname "Poncho" as a child because he was a fan of the television series Cisco Kid. He earned a BFA from the Maryland Institute College of Art in 1984, majoring in graphic design and photography.

== Career ==
Brown started his career as a sign painter, and opened a sign painting business at the age of seventeen. He describes his first major career step was working with Dick Gregory, who had Brown create illustrations for the advertising of Gregory’s Bahamian diet. As a painter, one of his first major exhibitions was at the Jacob Javits Center. In addition to solo exhibitions, he has also exhibited at group exhibitions, including the Philadelphia Art Exposition and the Chrysler Financial African Festival of the Arts. As of 1996 his work was sold in around 1500 galleries within the US. In 1999 his work was featured in the books Wrapped in Pride and Evelyn and Mercer Redcross's Connecting People with Art: Contemporary African American Art.

His artwork has appeared in Upscale, Ebony, Essence, and Jet magazines. On television, his artwork has also appeared on the series Soul Food, The Wire, A Different World, and In the House. Brown has also produced book cover art; his work has been used inside of other books as well; he has produced visual images for dance productions; and his work has been used for festival art for events including the Western Maryland Blues Fest and the Capital Jazz Fest. Brown works and creates is art in Baltimore, Maryland. Brown also curated the Baltimore “MASTERS” Art of the Ancestors, an exhibition that featured the works of deceased Baltimore artists.

== Recent work ==
In 2014 Brown exhibited as a part of the Jamaican Arts Odyssey programme, and created work for an exhibition at the Hirshhorn Museum and Sculpture Garden. In 2015 Brown worked on the cataloguing of the art left by the late artist Carolyn Anne Watts, whose lifelong collection of paintings was not discovered until after her suicide, as a part of his recognition of the role of art in mental illness. In 2017, Brown’s work was displayed at Tower Square in Springfield, MA in an exhibition entitled Stronger than Pride as a part of the city’s Black History Month recognition. He has been critical in the past of the trend of only showing the work of African American artists during the month of February.

== Style ==
According to the Philadelphia Tribune, Brown "primarily works in acrylic, although [he] uses a variety of mediums and styles to express his interests in Afrocentric themes, Ancient Egyptology and dance — it’s a style that combines past and present art to create a sense of realism, mysticism, and beauty." In addition to his paintings and illustrations, Brown has also worked in the field of sculpture. Brown has stated that he endeavors to depict African American people in a positive manner.

== Recognition ==
Brown was the recipient of the Artist of the Year award from the African-American Visual Art Association in 2000. In 2008 he received a Black Music & Art Award. He is also the youngest inductee into the Carver Vocational-Technical High School Hall of Fame. His work has been listed in the collection of the Charles H. Wright Museum of African American History as a part of its Visions of Our 44th President commissioned exhibition.

== Personal life ==
His parents were Diretha V. Hall Brown, a dietary aide, and Larry O'Neill Brown, Sr, a school teacher and coach. He was middle child of three. Brown is the founder of the non-profit Raising the Arts, which supports nonprofit and African-American organizations. He has also served on the Steering Committee of the Walters Art Museum in Baltimore. On November 10, 1995 the artist’s studio was engulfed in an 11 alarm fire that destroyed the Hollins Street Exchange in southwest Baltimore. Brown was reported to have lost $1.5 million in original works, reproductions, and all personal art predating the tragedy.
