= Laurie Halsey Brown =

American artist and curator

Laurie Halsey Brown is an American artist and curator based in San Francisco. Best known for her collaborative projects incorporating urban landscapes, Brown founded, in 2008, the artistic laboratory senseofplace LAB.

Brown earned an MFA from the California Institute of the Arts, studied psychology in New York, and worked in Rotterdam for five years. She taught a course of her own design, “Interdisciplinary Media and Contemporary Society”, at The New School from 2000 to 2012. She has lived in San Francisco since 2007.

== Work ==
Brown was one of 15 artists that were part of a residency program, sponsored by the Lower Manhattan Cultural Council, located in Tower 1 of the World Trade Center when the September 11 attacks destroyed both the working space and the council's Tower 5 office. The group exhibited nonetheless, showing at the nearby New Museum of Contemporary Art. Brown re-used material from her original project and, wrote New York Times critic Holland Cotter, produced "something very different in tone and meaning. Using bits from a film about the ubiquitous security surveillance at the trade center, she has simulated the panoramic view she saw daily from her Tower 1 studio windows: New York Harbor with the Statue of Liberty to the south, Tower 2 to the southeast." The work incorporated footage she had taken the day before the attacks.

While living in Rotterdam, Brown created a webcast and poster addressing controversies over squatting in the Netherlands. Brown's series, Honoring Japan's 'sense of place', includes a triptych that combines a textile with photograph of a crowded intersection that echos the cloth's colors and grid. Another work, also employing juxtaposition of two mediums, combines a photo of people sitting over a canal two abstract watercolors. "When I'm in a place", she was quoted in SFWeekly, "it's not just seeing one thing—it's a layering of different things, with lots of different elements."

Brown has also done research and writing for the peer-reviewed journal Arts and Humanities in Higher Education. On February 1st, 2009, a journal article she collaborated on was published online. This article is titled Interface: Virtual Environments in Art, Design and Education. It discusses the increased incorporation of Virtual Learning Environments (VLEs) in academic settings and how instructors in art fields can determine their importance in a "hands-on" discipline like art.

In October 2013, Brown invited four artists, Jeff Hantman, Alicia Escott, Brian King and Githinji Mbire, to create works using debris dumped illegally on the streets of Oakland. The resulting works employed, among other found objects, a truck tire, leather couch, and jawbone from an unidentified rodent.

As of 2026, Brown is working on a project titled the unconscious is a window that investigates the relationship between neurodivergence, space, and childhood experiences.
