= Laurie Brown (photographer) =

American photographer (born 1937)

- Born: 1937 (age 88–89)
- Occupation: Photographer

Laurie Brown (born 1937) is an American photographer sometimes associated with the New Topographics genre.

Her work is included in the collections of the Los Angeles County Museum of Art, the Museum of Fine Arts Houston, the Philadelphia Museum of Art and the Museum of Fine Arts Houston.
