= Larry Brown (defensive tackle) =

American football player (born 1984)

No. 78
- Position: Defensive line

Personal information
- Born: October 15, 1984 (age 42); Spartanburg, South Carolina, U.S.
- Listed height: 6 ft 3 in (1.91 m)
- Listed weight: 295 lb (134 kg)

Career information
- College: Oklahoma State
- NFL draft: 2007: undrafted

Career history
- Oakland Raiders (2007)*; Tulsa Talons (2011); Cleveland Gladiators (2011)*; Dallas Vigilantes (2011)
- * Offseason or practice squad member only

Career AFL statistics
- Tackles: 1

Larry Brown (born October 15, 1984) is an American former professional football defensive tackle. He began his career with the Oakland Raiders. He played collegiately for Oklahoma State Cowboys in the NCAA.
