= Larry Bubbles Brown =

American comedian

- Born: Larry Brown; Ohio, United States

Comedy career
- Medium: Stand-up, television
- Genre: observational comedy
- Subject: self-deprecation

Larry "Bubbles" Brown is a San Francisco based, deadpan, self-deprecating comedian and actor. He is a regular at the San Francisco Punch Line, Rooster T. Feathers, and The Throckmorton Theater in Mill Valley. His debut album, "It's Gotta Get Better", was released on March 3, 2020, by You Lucky Dog Productions and FastLayne Comedy; exactly 39 years after his first open mic set at the Holy City Zoo.

Nicknamed "Bubbles" by comedian Paula Poundstone as a sarcastic nod to his chronically depressed persona.
