= 2011 Kansas City Command season =

Arena Football League team season

- Head coach: Danton Barto
- Home stadium: Sprint Center

Results
- Record: 6–12
- Division place: 4th NC Central
- Playoffs: Did not qualify

The 2011 Kansas City Command season was the fourth season for the franchise in the Arena Football League, and the first under their new team name, having previously been known as the Kansas City Brigade. The team was coached by Danton Barto and played their home games at Sprint Center. This is the first season for the Command since 2008, after the league went on hiatus in 2009 and the franchise was not active in 2010. The Command finished the season 6–12, failing to qualify for the playoffs.

== Standings ==
Central Division
Team	W	L	PCT	PF	PA	DIV	CON	Home	Away
y-Chicago Rush	13	5	.722	957	833	6–2	9–3	7–2	6–3
x-Dallas Vigilantes	11	7	.611	1061	1007	6–2	7–5	6–3	5–4
Tulsa Talons	8	10	.444	894	899	3–5	4–7	4–5	4–5
Kansas City Command	6	12	.333	854	974	3–5	4–9	4–4	2–7
Iowa Barnstormers	5	13	.278	916	1116	2–6	5–7	4–5	1–8

y - Clinched division
x - Clinched playoff berth

== Regular season schedule ==
The Command began the season on the road against the Dallas Vigilantes on March 12. Their first home game of the season did not come until April 15 when they took on the Iowa Barnstormers. They played the Tulsa Talons at home in their final regular season game.

Week	Day	Date	Kickoff	Opponent	Results		Location	Report
Week	Day	Date	Kickoff	Opponent	Score	Record	Location	Report
1	Saturday	March 12	Noon CST	at Dallas Vigilantes	L 46–53	0–1	American Airlines Center	
2	Friday	March 18	9:30 p.m. CDT	at San Jose SaberCats	L 60–57	0–2	HP Pavilion at San Jose	
3	Bye							
4	Friday	April 1	10:00 p.m. CDT	at Spokane Shock	L34–61	0–3	Spokane Veterans Memorial Arena	
5	Saturday	April 9	7:30 p.m. CDT	Iowa Barnstormers	W 62–48	1–3	Sprint Center	
6	Saturday	April 16	7:00 p.m. CDT	Arizona Rattlers	L 49–63	1–4	Sprint Center	
7	Friday	April 22	7:00 p.m. CDT	at Chicago Rush	W 58–51	2–4	Allstate Arena	
8	Friday	April 29	7:30 p.m. CDT	Dallas Vigilantes	L 63–72	2–5	Sprint Center	
9	Saturday	May 7	7:00 p.m. CDT	New Orleans VooDoo	L 52–59	2–6	Sprint Center	
10	Friday	May 13	6:30 p.m. CDT	at Tampa Bay Storm	L 30–46	2–7	St. Pete Times Forum	
11	Saturday	May 21	7:00 p.m. CDT	at Tulsa Talons	W 40–38	3–7	BOK Center	
12	Saturday	May 28	7:00 p.m. CDT	Spokane Shock	W 45–42	4–7	Sprint Center	
13	Saturday	June 4	1:00 p.m. CDT	Chicago Rush	L 30–58	4–8	Sprint Center	
14	Saturday	June 11	7:00 p.m. CDT	at Milwaukee Mustangs	L 34–54	4–9	Bradley Center	
15	Sunday	June 19	1:00 p.m. CDT	Cleveland Gladiators	W 50–41	5–9	Sprint Center	
16	Friday	June 24	7:00 p.m. CDT	at Utah Blaze	L 60–61	5–10	EnergySolutions Arena	
17	Bye							
18	Saturday	July 9	7:05 p.m. CDT	at Iowa Barnstormers	L 40–48	5–11	Wells Fargo Arena	
19	Friday	July 15	7:30 p.m. CDT	Jacksonville Sharks	W 49–48 (OT)	6–11	Sprint Center	
20	Saturday	July 23	7:00 p.m. CDT	Tulsa Talons	L 55–71	6–12	Sprint Center	

== Roster ==
Kansas City Command 2011 final roster
Quarterbacks: 4 Stephen Wasil; 12 Steven Gachette; Fullbacks: 22 Victor Mann FB/LB; Wide receivers: 2 Bradly Chavez; 6 Steven Savoy; 6 Christian Wise; 8 Bret Smith; 10 Robert Gill; 11 Brent Holmes; 13 Aaron Hosack; 18 O. J. Simpson WR/DB; 18 Tommy Saunders; 20 Tod Devoe	Offensive linemen: 56 Kimani Jones; 67 Rich Ranglin; 69 Dan Jones; 99 Cornelius Dixon; Defensive linemen: 32 Willie Evans; 44 Trey Bryant III; 90 Bobby Payne; 92 Bryan Robinson; 93 DeVonte Peterson; 96 Jaron Baston; 96 Brandon Jenkins	Linebackers: 7 Tyus Jackson; Defensive backs: 1 Carlton Brown; 3 Kenneth Fontenette; 5 Erick Harris; 9 Sergio Giliam; 21 Rashad Barksdale; Kickers: 15 Brian Umstead

== Regular season ==
=== Week 1: at Dallas Vigilantes ===
Week 1: Kansas City Command at Dallas Vigilantes – Game summary

Quarter	1	2	3	4	Total
Command	0	14	13	19	46
Vigilantes	13	10	14	16	53

at American Airlines Center, Dallas, Texas

- Date: March 12
- Game time: Noon CST
- Game attendance: 5,129
- Referee: Chris Snead
- Recap

Game information

1st quarter

- Dallas – (9:11) Derrick Ross 37-yard run (Remy Hamilton kick failed), Dallas 6–0
- Dallas – (3:31) Derrick Ross 1-yard run (Remy Hamilton kick), Dallas 13–0

2nd quarter

- Kansas City – (14:14) Aaron Hosack 2-yard pass from J.J. Raterink (Mike Salerno kick), Dallas 13–7
- Kansas City – (11:15) Bret Smith 11-yard pass from J.J. Raterink (Mike Salerno kick), Kansas City 14–13
- Dallas – (1:00) Matt Fields 4-yard pass from Dan Raudabaugh (Remy Hamilton kick), Dallas 20–14
- Dallas – (0:00) Remy Hamilton 20-yard field goal, Dallas 23–14

3rd quarter

- Dallas – (14:29) Tiger Jones 23-yard pass from Dan Raudabaugh (Remy Hamilton kick), Dallas 30–14
- Kansas City – (8:59) Bret Smith 19-yard pass from J.J. Raterink (Mike Salerno kick), Dallas 30–21
- Dallas – (4:21) Matt Fields 2-yard run (Remy Hamilton kick), Dallas 37–21
- Kansas City – (1:20) Steven Savoy 24-yard pass from J.J. Raterink (Mike Salerno kick failed), Dallas 37–27

4th quarter

- Dallas – (9:33) Derrick Ross 4-yard run (Remy Hamilton kick), Dallas 44–27
- Dallas – (8:11) Team safety, Dallas 46–27
- Kansas City – (4:21) Bret Smith 21-yard pass from J.J. Raterink (J.J. Raterink pass failed), Dallas 46–33
- Kansas City – (1:29) Aaron Hosack 4-yard pass from J.J. Raterink (Mike Salerno kick), Dallas 46–40
- Dallas – (0:30) Derrick Ross 5-yard run (Remy Hamilton kick), Dallas 53–40
- Kansas City – (0:00) Aaron Hosack 13-yard pass from J.J. Raterink, Dallas 53–46

Passing

- Kansas City – J.J. Raterink: 32/48, 338 yards, 7 TD
- Dallas – Dan Raudabaugh: 21/34, 250 yards, 2 TD, 1 INT

Rushing

- Kansas City – J.J. Raterink: 1 att, 0 yards
- Dallas – Derrick Ross: 15 att, 66 yards, 4 TD

Receiving

- Kansas City – Bret Smith: 11 rec, 133 yards, 3 TD
- Dallas – Matt Fields: 8 rec, 74 yards, 1 TD

=== Week 2: at San Jose SaberCats ===
Week 2: Kansas City Command at San Jose SaberCats – Game summary

Quarter	1	2	3	4	Total
Command	6	22	14	15	57
SaberCats	14	20	9	7	50

at HP Pavilion at San Jose, San Jose, California

- Date: March 18
- Game time: 9:30 p.m. CDT
- Game attendance: 9,563
- Referee: Shawn Hochuli
- Recap

Game information

1st quarter

- San Jose – (12:56) Nicherin Flowers 9-yard pass from Mark Grieb (Juan Gamboa kick), San Jose 7–0
- San Jose – (5:42) Samora Goodson 27-yard pass from Mark Grieb (Juan Gamboa kick), San Jose 14–0
- Kansas City – (2:48) Steven Savoy 32-yard pass from J.J. Raterink (Mike Salerno kick failed), San Jose 14–6

2nd quarter

- San Jose – (5:29) Chad Cook 1-yard run (Juan Gamboa kick), San Jose 21–6
- Kansas City – (1:50) Bret Smith 33-yard pass from J.J. Raterink (Mike Salerno kick), San Jose 21–13
- San Jose – (0:59) Rodney Wright 58-yard kickoff return (Juan Gamboa kick), San Jose 28–13
- Kansas City – (0:31) Steven Savoy 14-yard pass from J.J. Raterink (Steven Savoy rush), San Jose 28–21
- San Jose – (0:20) Rodney Wright 38-yard pass from Mark Grieb (Juan Gamboa kick failed), San Jose 34–21
- Kansas City – (0:02) Bret Smith 19-yard pass from J.J. Raterink (Mike Salerno kick), San Jose 34–28

3rd quarter

- Kansas City – (12:56) Bradley Chavez 30-yard pass from J.J. Raterink (Mike Salerno kick), Kansas City 35–34
- San Jose – (10:30) Nicherin Flowers 11-yard pass from Mark Grieb (Juan Gamboa kick failed), San Jose 40–35
- Kansas City – (4:58) Bradley Chavez 18-yard pass from J.J. Raterink (Mike Salerno kick), Kansas City 42–40
- San Jose – (1:12) Juan Gamboa 17-yard field goal, San Jose 43–42

4th quarter

- Kansas City – (12:37) Christian Wise 10-yard pass from J.J. Raterink (J.J. Raterink pass), Kansas City 50–43
- San Jose – (6:49) Chad Cook 2-yard run (Juan Gamboa kick failed), Kansas City 50–49
- San Jose – (0:53) Mark Grieb 2-yard run (Mark Grieb pass), San Jose 57–50
- Kansas City – (0:39) Bradley Chavez 35-yard pass from J.J. Raterink (Mike Salerno kick), Tied 57–57
- San Jose – (0:02) Juan Gamboa 18-yard field goal, San Jose 60–57

Passing

- Kansas City – J.J. Raterink: 28/45, 364 yards, 8 TD, 1 INT
- San Jose – Mark Grieb: 27/39, 340 yards, 4 TD

Rushing

- Kansas City – J.J. Raterink: 4 att, 8 yards
- San Jose – Chad Cook: 4 att, 6 yards, 2 TD

Receiving

- Kansas City – Bret Smith: 12 rec, 132 yards, 2 TD
- San Jose – Samora Goodson: 8 rec, 144 yards, 1 TD

=== Week 4: at Spokane Shock ===
Week 4: Kansas City Command at Spokane Shock – Game summary

Quarter	1	2	3	4	Total
Command	6	6	7	15	34
Shock	17	21	10	13	61

at Spokane Veterans Memorial Arena, Spokane, Washington

- Date: April 1
- Game time: 10:00 p.m. CDT
- Game attendance: 9,172
- Referee: Shawn Hochuli
- Recap

Game information

1st quarter

- Spokane – (14:34) Shaun Kauleinamoku 30-yard pass from Kyle Rowley (Raul Vijil kick), Spokane 7–0
- Kansas City – (11:11) Bradley Chavez 7-yard pass from J.J. Raterink (Brian Umstead kick failed), Spokane 7–6
- Spokane – (7:22) Raul Vijil 4-yard pass from Kyle Rowley (Taylor Rowan kick), Spokane 14–6
- Spokane – Taylor Rowan 27-yard field goal, Spokane 17–6

2nd quarter

- Kansas City – (13:58) J.J. Raterink 3-yard run (Brian Umstead kick blocked), Spokane 17–12
- Spokane – (10:47) Emery Sammons 25-yard pass from Kyle Rowley (Taylor Rowan kick), Spokane 24–12
- Spokane – (5:58) Greg Orton 18-yard pass from Kyle Rowley (Taylor Rowan kick), Spokane 31–12
- Spokane – (0:12) Raul Vijil 11-yard pass from Kyle Rowley (Taylor Rowan kick), Spokane 38–12

3rd quarter

- Kansas City – (13:13) J.J. Raterink 1-yard run (Brian Umstead kick), Spokane 38–19
- Spokane – (10:24) Shaun Kauleinamoku 20-yard pass from Kyle Rowley (Taylor Rowan kick), Spokane 45–19
- Spokane – (5:30) Taylor Rowan 19-yard field goal, Spokane 48–19

4th quarter

- Spokane – (14:55) Emery Sammons 24-yard pass from Kyle Rowley (Taylor Rowan kick failed), Spokane 54–19
- Kansas City – (9:21) J.J. Raterink 2-yard run (Brian Umstead kick), Spokane 54–26
- Spokane – (6:26) Emery Sammons 2-yard run (Taylor Rowan kick), Spokane 61–26
- Kansas City – (3:01) Steven Savoy 19-yard pass from J.J. Raterink (Steven Savoy rush), Spokane 61–34

Passing

- Kansas City – J.J. Raterink: 26/44, 306 yards, 2 TD, 1 INT
- Spokane – Kyle Rowley: 19/30, 219 yards, 7 TD

Rushing

- Kansas City – J.J. Raterink: 6 att, 17 yards, 3 TD
- Spokane – Clay Harrell: 2 att, 7 yards

Receiving

- Kansas City – Steven Savoy: 8 rec, 131 yards, 1 TD
- Spokane – Shaun Kauleinamoku: 5 rec, 77 yards, 2 TD

=== Week 5: vs. Iowa Barnstormers ===
Week 5: Iowa Barnstormers at Kansas City Command – Game summary

Quarter	1	2	3	4	Total
Barnstormers	0	12	6	30	48
Command	13	7	14	28	62

at Sprint Center, Kansas City, Missouri

- Date: April 9
- Game time: 7:30 p.m. CDT
- Game attendance: 5,438
- Referee: Shawn Hochuli
- Recap

Game information

1st quarter

- Kansas City – (11:58) Christian Wise 29-yard pass from J.J. Raterink (Brian Umstead kick failed), Kansas City 6–0
- Kansas City – (3:10) Bret Smith 10-yard pass from J.J. Raterink (Brian Umstead kick), Kansas City 13–0

2nd quarter

- Iowa – (14:57) Todd Blythe 5-yard pass from Brad Banks (Phil Marfuggi kick failed), Kansas City 13–6
- Kansas City – (4:58) Bradley Chavez 5-yard pass from J.J. Raterink (Brian Umstead kick), Kansas City 20–6
- Iowa – (3:20) Errick McCown 34-yard pass from Brad Banks (Phil Marfuggi kick blocked), Kansas City 20–12

3rd quarter

- Iowa – (12:14) Todd Blythe 7-yard pass from Brad Banks (Phil Marfuggi kick failed), Kansas City 20–18
- Kansas City – (7:35) Bret Smith 9-yard pass from J.J. Raterink (J.J. Raterink rush failed), Kansas City 26–18
- Kansas City – (1:34) Bradley Chavez 31-yard pass from J.J. Raterink (Steve Wasil rush), Kansas City 34–18

4th quarter

- Iowa – (12:36) Jesse Schmidt 13-yard pass from Brad Banks (Brad Banks rush), Kansas City 34–26
- Kansas City – (11:19) Bret Smith 38-yard pass from J.J. Raterink (Brian Umstead kick), Kansas City 41–26
- Iowa – (9:26) Jesse Schmidt 24-yard pass from Brad Banks (Jesse Schmidt rush), Kansas City 41–34
- Iowa – (7:40) Charles Johnson 0-yard fumble recovery (Phil Marfuggi kick), Tied 41–41
- Kansas City – (5:56) Bradley Chavez 21-yard pass from J.J. Raterink (Brian Umstead kick), Kansas City 48–41
- Kansas City – (4:36) Lee Bryant 0-yard fumble recovery (Brian Umstead kick), Kansas City 55–41
- Iowa – (2:37) Errick McCown 17-yard pass from Brad Banks (Phil Marfuggi kick), Kansas City 55–48
- Kansas City – (0:19) Victor Mann 11-yard run (Brian Umstead kick), Kansas City 62–48

Passing

- Iowa – Brad Banks: 22/35, 310 yards, 6 TD, 3 INT
- Kansas City – J.J. Raterink: 25/41, 2168 yards, 7 TD, 3 INT

Rushing

- Iowa – Brad Banks: 1 att, 9 yards
- Kansas City – Victor Mann: 5 att, 24 yards, 1 TD

Receiving

- Iowa – Jesse Schmidt: 7 rec, 113 yards, 2 TD
- Kansas City – Bret Smith: 10 rec, 122 yards, 3 TD

=== Week 6: vs. Arizona Rattlers ===
Week 6: Arizona Rattlers at Kansas City Command – Game summary

Quarter	1	2	3	4	Total
Rattlers	21	7	14	21	63
Command	7	14	14	14	49

at Sprint Center, Kansas City, Missouri

- Date: April 16
- Game time: 7:00 p.m. CDT
- Game attendance: 4,166
- Referee: Larry Smith
- Recap

Game information

1st quarter

- Arizona – (13:56) Rod Windsor 28-yard pass from Nick Davila (Fabrizio Scaccia kick), Arizona 7–0
- Kansas City – (9:25) Steven Savoy 11-yard pass from J.J. Raterink (Brian Umstead kick), Tied 7–7
- Arizona – (3:43) Rod Winsor 2-yard pass from Nick Davila (Fabrizio Scaccia kick), Arizona 14–7
- Arizona – (0:25) Odie Armstrong 1-yard run (Fabrizio Scaccia kick), Arizona 21–7

2nd quarter

- Kansas City – (9:52) Aaron Hosack 13-yard pass from J.J. Raterink (Brian Umstead kick), Arizona 21–14
- Arizona – (5:26) Kerry Reed 3-yard pass from Nick Davila (Fabrizio Scaccia kick), Arizona 28–14
- Kansas City – (2:32) Steven Savoy 20-yard pass from J.J. Raterink (Brian Umstead kick), Arizona 28–21

3rd quarter

- Kansas City – (14:49) Christian Wise 54-yard kickoff return (Brian Umstead kick), Tied 28–28
- Arizona – (13:09) Rod Winsor 22-yard pass from Nick Davila (Fabrizio Scaccia kick), Arizona 35–28
- Kansas City – (7:54) Bret Smith 8-yard pass from J.J. Raterink (Brian Umstead kick), Tied 35–35
- Arizona – (7:11) Trandon Harvey 57-yard kickoff return (Fabrizio Scaccia kick), Arizona 42–35

4th quarter

- Arizona – (14:58) Trandon Harvey 2-yard pass from Nick Davila (Fabrizio Scaccia kick), Arizona 49–35
- Kansas City – (13:03) Aaron Hosack 0-yard fumble recovery (Brian Umstead kick), Arizona 49–42
- Arizona – (9:54) Rod Windsor 11-yard pass from Nick Davila (Fabrizio Scaccia kick), Arizona 56–42
- Arizona – (5:23) Rod Windsor 14-yard pass from Nick Davila (Fabrizio Scaccia kick), Arizona 63–42
- Kansas City – (0:09) Steven Savoy 22-yard pass from J.J. Raterink (Brian Umstead kick), Arizona 63–49

Passing

- Arizona – Nick Davila: 29/36, 330 yards, 7 TD, 1 INT
- Kansas City – J.J. Raterink: 23/40, 245 yards, 6 TD, 1 INT

Rushing

- Arizona – Odie Armstrong: 2 att, 9 yards, 1 TD
- Kansas City – J.J. Raterink: 1 att, 3 yards

Receiving

- Arizona – Rod Windsor: 16 rec, 217 yards, 5 TD
- Kansas City – Steven Savoy: 8 rec, 133 yards, 3 TD

=== Week 7: at Chicago Rush ===
Week 7: Kansas City Command at Chicago Rush – Game summary

Quarter	1	2	3	4	Total
Command	7	31	6	14	58
Rush	13	17	7	14	51

at Allstate Arena, Rosemont, Illinois

- Date: April 22
- Game time: 7:00 p.m. CDT
- Game attendance: 7,310
- Referee: Alex Kemp
- Recap

Game information

1st quarter

- Chicago – (13:10) Reggie Gray 10-yard pass from Russ Michna (Chris Gould kick), Chicago 7–0
- Kansas City – (8:09) Steven Savoy 3-yard pass from J.J. Raterink (Brian Umstead kick), Tied 7–7
- Chicago – (3:47) Johnie Kirton 5-yard run (Chris Gould kick blocked), Chicago 13–7

2nd quarter

- Kansas City – (14:58) J.J. Raterink 1-yard run (Brian Umstead kick), Kansas City 14–13
- Chicago – (12:51) Charles Dillon 25-yard pass from Russ Michna (Chris Gould kick), Chicago 20–14
- Chicago – (6:01) Chris Gould 23-yard field goal, Chicago 23–14
- Kansas City – (4:11) Bret Smith 34-yard pass from J.J. Raterink (Brian Umstead kick), Chicago 23–21
- Chicago – (2:30) Joe Clermond 43-yard fumble recovery (Chris Gould kick), Chicago 30–21
- Kansas City – (0:45) J.J. Raterink 25-yard run (Brian Umstead kick), Chicago 30–28
- Kansas City – (0:36) Steven Savoy 1-yard run (Brian Umstead kick), Kansas City 35–30
- Kansas City – (0:00) Brian Umstead 37-yard field goal, Kansas City 38–30

3rd quarter

- Kansas City – (12:45) Steven Savoy 20-yard pass from J.J. Raterink (Brian Umstead kick failed), Kansas City 44–30
- Chicago – (12:45) Reggie Gray 55-yard kickoff return (Chris Gould kick), Kansas City 44–37

4th quarter

- Chicago – (13:14) Johnie Kirton 20-yard pass from Russ Michna (Chris Gould kick), Tied 44–44
- Kansas City – (10:07) Aaron Hosack 3-yard pass from J.J. Raterink (Brian Umstead kick), Kansas City 51–44
- Chicago – (4:23) Johnie Kirton 5-yard pass from Russ Michna (Chris Gould kick), Tied 51–51
- Kansas City – (2:08) Steven Savoy 32-yard pass from J.J. Raterink (Brian Umstead kick), Kansas City 58–51

Passing

- Kansas City – J.J. Raterink: 27/36, 286 yards, 5 TD, 2 INT
- Chicago – Russ Michna: 15/26, 163 yards, 4 TD

Rushing

- Kansas City – J.J. Raterink: 6 att, 47 yards, 2 TD
- Chicago – Johnie Kirton: 7 att, 34 yards, 1 TD

Receiving

- Kansas City – Steven Savoy: 14 rec, 136 yards, 3 TD
- Chicago – Reggie Gray: 4 rec, 52 yards, 1 TD

=== Week 8: vs. Dallas Vigilantes ===
Week 8: Dallas Vigilantes at Kansas City Command – Game summary

Quarter	1	2	3	4	Total
Vigilantes	14	14	21	23	72
Command	29	8	13	13	63

at Sprint Center, Kansas City, Missouri

- Date: April 29
- Game time: 7:30 p.m. CDT
- Game attendance: 3,502
- Referee: Jim Corpora
- Recap

Game information

1st quarter

- Kansas City – (13:12) Aaron Hosack 6-yard pass from J.J. Raterink (Brian Umstead kick), Kansas City 7–0
- Dallas – (12:13) DeAndrew Rubin 45-yard pass from Dan Raudabaugh (Remy Hamilton kick), 7–7
- Kansas City – (10:13) Bret Smith 18-yard pass from J.J. Raterink (Brian Umstead kick failed), Kansas City 13–7
- Kansas City – (9:05) Erick Harris 0-yard net recovery (Brian Umstead kick), Kansas City 20–7
- Kansas City – (8:25) Bryan Robinson safety, Kansas City 22–7
- Kansas City – (5:26) Steven Savoy 5-yard pass from J.J. Raterink (Brian Umstead kick), Kansas City 29–7
- Dallas – (3:37) DeAndrew Rubin 9-yard pass from Dan Raudabaugh (Remy Hamilton kick), Kansas City 29–14

2nd quarter

- Dallas – (14:56) Matt Fields 11-yard pass from Dan Raudabaugh (Remy Hamilton kick), Kansas City 29–21
- Dallas – (6:52) Derrick Ross 6-yard run (Remy Hamilton kick), Kansas City 29–28
- Kansas City – (0:48) Bret Smith 2-yard pass from J.J. Raterink (Brian Umstead kick failed), Kansas City 35–28
- Kansas City – (0:28) Tyus Jackson safety, Kansas City 37–28

3rd quarter

- Dallas – (11:04) Derrick Ross 1-yard run (Remy Hamilton kick), Kansas City 37–35
- Kansas City – (9:54) Aaron Hosack 35-yard pass from J.J. Raterink (Brian Umstead kick), Kansas City 44–35
- Dallas – (7:36) DeAndrew Rubin 38-yard pass from Dan Raudabaugh (Remy Hamilton kick), Kansas City 44–42
- Dallas – (1:30) Anthony Jones 35-yard pass from Dan Raudabaugh (Remy Hamilton kick), Dallas 49–44
- Kansas City – (0:04) Christian Wise 37-yard pass from J.J. Raterink (Brian Umstead kick failed), Kansas City 50–49

4th quarter

- Dallas – (11:13) Matt Fields 4-yard pass from Dan Raudabaugh (Remy Hamilton kick), Dallas 56–50
- Kansas City – (8:12) Bret Smith 12-yard pass from J.J. Raterink (Brian Umstead kick failed), 56–56
- Dallas – (3:29) Derrick Ross 14-yard run (Remy Hamilton kick), Dallas 63–56
- Kansas City – (00:42) Aaron Hosack 31-yard pass from J.J. Raterink (Brian Umstead kick), 63–63
- Dallas – (0:14) Anthony Jones 6-yard pass from Dan Raudabaugh (Remy Hamilton kick), Dallas 70–63
- Dallas – (0:00) Dusty Bear safety, Dallas 72–63

Passing

- Dallas – Dan Raudabaugh: 29/35, 377 yards, 7 TD
- Kansas City – J.J. Raterink: 20/32, 343 yards, 8 TD, 1 INT

Rushing

- Dallas – Derrick Ross: 6 att, 24 yards, 3 TD
- Kansas City – J.J. Raterink: 10 att, 20 yards

Receiving

- Dallas – Matt Fields: 14 rec, 149 yards, 2 TD
- Kansas City – Aaron Hosack: 15 rec, 167 yards, 3 TD

=== Week 9: vs. New Orleans VooDoo ===
Week 9: New Orleans VooDoo at Kansas City Command – Game summary

Quarter	1	2	3	4	Total
VooDoo	14	7	7	21	49
Command	7	21	14	10	52

at Sprint Center, Kansas City, Missouri

- Date: May 7
- Game time: 7:00 p.m. CDT
- Game attendance: 4,422
- Referee: Larry Smith
- Recap

Game information

1st quarter

- New Orleans – (5:30) Jonathan Ruffin 32-yard field goal, New Orleans 3–0
- New Orleans – (5:00) James Harris 2-yard run (Jonathan Ruffin kick), New Orleans 10–0
- Kansas City – (3:06) Bret Smith 19-yard pass from J.J. Raterink (Brian Umstead kick), New Orleans 10–7
- New Orleans – (0:00) Tom Taggert 13-yard run (Jonathan Ruffin kick), New Orleans 17–7

2nd quarter

- Kansas City – (12:04) Bret Smith 16-yard pass from J.J. Raterink (Brian Umstead kick), New Orleans 17–14
- New Orleans – (10:55) James Jordan 45-yard pass from Chris Wallace (Jonathan Ruffin kick), New Orleans 24–14
- Kansas City – (1:48) Erick Harris 27-yard interception return (Brian Umstead kick), New Orleans 24–21
- New Orleans – (0:27) Chris Wilson 14-yard pass from Chris Wallace (Jonathan Ruffin kick), New Orleans 31–21
- Kansas City – (0:00) Christian Wise 4-yard pass from J.J. Raterink (Brian Umstead kick), New Orleans 31–28

3rd quarter

- Kansas City – (13:17) Victor Mann 1-yard run (Brian Umstead kick), Kansas City 35–31
- New Orleans – (9:24) Tom Taggert 1-yard run (Jonathan Ruffin kick), New Orleans 38–35
- Kansas City – (6:45) Aaron Hosack 8-yard pass from J.J. Raterink (Brian Umstead kick), Kansas City 42–38

4th quarter

- Kansas City – (13:17) Brian Umstead 32-yard field goal, Kansas City 45–38
- New Orleans – (12:21) James Jordan 31-yard pass from Chris Wallace (Jonathan Ruffin kick), Tied 45–45
- New Orleans – (8:33) Jerron Wishom 54-yard interception return (Jonathan Ruffin kick), New Orleans 52–45
- Kansas City – (4:10) Christian Wise 3-yard run (Brian Umstead kick), Tied 52–52
- New Orleans – (2:45) Chris Wilson 38-yard pass from Chris Wallace (Jonathan Ruffin kick), New Orleans 59–52

Passing

- New Orleans – Chris Wallace: 20/32, 250 yards, 4 TD, 1 INT
- Kansas City – J.J. Raterink: 27/40, 324 yards, 4 TD, 2 INT

Rushing

- New Orleans – Tom Taggert: 3 att, 14 yards, 2 TD
- Kansas City – Christian Wise: 2 att, 2 yards, 1 TD

Receiving

- New Orleans – Jordan James: 8 rec, 123 yards, 2 TD
- Kansas City – Bret Smith: 11 rec, 133 yards, 2 TD

=== Week 10: at Tampa Bay Storm ===
Week 10: Kansas City Command at Tampa Bay Storm – Game summary

Quarter	1	2	3	4	Total
Command	3	13	7	7	30
Storm	14	13	6	13	46

at St. Pete Times Forum, Tampa, Florida

- Date: May 13
- Game time: 7:30 p.m. EDT
- Game attendance: 11,172
- Referee: Alex Kemp
- Recap

Game information

1st quarter

- Tampa Bay – (12:45) Amari Jackson 29-yard pass from Brian Zbydniewski (Kyle Chilton kick), Tampa Bay 7–0
- Kansas City – (7:15) Brian Umstead 21-yard field goal, Tampa Bay 7–3
- Tampa Bay – (1:59) Terrence Royal 2-yard run (Kyle Chilton kick), Tampa Bay 14–3

2nd quarter

- Tampa Bay – (5:32) Huey Whittaker 7-yard pass from Brian Zbydniewski (Kyle Chilton kick failed), Tampa Bay 20–3
- Kansas City – (4:19) Robert Gill 40-yard pass from J.J. Raterink (Brian Umstead kick), Tampa Bay 20–10
- Tampa Bay – (0:49) Huey Whittaker 2-yard pass from Brian Zbydniewski (Kyle Chilton kick), Tampa Bay 27–10
- Kansas City – (0:11) Bret Smith 19-yard pass from J.J. Raterink (Brian Umstead kick failed), Tampa Bay 27–16

3rd quarter

- Kansas City – (12:56) Aaron Hosack 5-yard pass from J.J. Raterink (Brian Umstead kick), Tampa Bay 27–23
- Tampa Bay – (2:41) Amari Jackson 9-yard pass from Brian Zbydniewski (Kyle Chilton kick failed), Tampa Bay 33–23

4th quarter

- Tampa Bay – (10:19) Amari Jackson 5-yard pass from Brian Zbydniewski (Kyle Chilton kick failed), Tampa Bay 39–23
- Tampa Bay – (1:44) Amari Jackson 35-yard pass from Brian Zbydniewski (Kyle Chilton kick), Tampa Bay 46–23
- Kansas City – (0:06) Aaron Hosack 4-yard pass from J.J. Raterink (Brian Umstead kick), Tampa Bay 46–30

Passing

- Kansas City – J.J. Raterink: 21/35, 289 yards, 4 TD, 1 INT
- Tampa Bay – Brian Zbydniewski: 26/44, 277 yards, 6 TD

Rushing

- Kansas City – J.J. Raterink: 3 att, 7 yards
- Tampa Bay – Terrance Royal: 4 att, 17 yards, 1 TD

Receiving

- Kansas City – Robert Gill: 7 rec, 159 yards, 1 TD
- Tampa Bay – Amari Jackson: 14 rec, 187 yards, 4 TD

=== Week 11: at Tulsa Talons ===
Week 11: Kansas City Command at Tulsa Talons – Game summary

Quarter	1	2	3	4	Total
Command	7	6	7	20	40
Talons	7	7	10	14	38

at BOK Center, Tulsa, Oklahoma

- Date: May 21
- Game time: 7:00 p.m. CDT
- Referee: Joe Pester

Game information

1st quarter

- Tulsa – (8:46) Troy McBroom 13-yard pass from Matt Bassuener (Juan Bongarra kick), Tulsa 7–0
- Kansas City – (6:36) Robert Gill 5-yard pass from J.J. Raterink (Brian Umstead kick), Tied 7–7

2nd quarter

- Kansas City – (10:35) Victor Mann 5-yard run (Brian Umstead kick failed), Kansas City 13–7
- Tulsa – (5:15) Troy McBroom 8-yard pass from Matt Bassuener (Juan Bongarra kick), Tulsa 14–13

3rd quarter

- Tulsa – (8:24) Juan Bongarra 33-yard field goal, Tulsa 17–13
- Kansas City – (8:02) Todd Devoe 45-yard pass from J.J. Raterink (Brian Umstead kick), Kansas City 20–17
- Tulsa – (4:40) Troy McBroom 16-yard pass from Matt Bassuener (Juan Bongarra kick), Tulsa 24–20

4th quarter

- Tulsa – (14:11) Trent Shelton 33-yard pass from Matt Bassuener (Juan Bongarra kick), Tulsa 31–20
- Kansas City – (11:19) Bradly Chavez 9-yard pass from J.J. Raterink (Brian Umstead kick), Tulsa 31–27
- Kansas City – (7:37) Todd Devoe 2-yard pass from J.J. Raterink (Brian Umstead kick), Kansas City 34–31
- Tulsa – (1:37) Jamar Ransom 1-yard run (Juan Bongarra kick), Tulsa 38–34
- Kansas City – (0:00) Bradly Chavez 16-yard pass from J.J. Raterink (Team pass failed), Kansas City 40–38

Passing

- Kansas City – J.J. Raterink: 23/38, 287 yards, 5 TD, 1 INT
- Tulsa – Matt Bassuener: 24/41, 263 yards, 4 TD, 2 INT

Rushing

- Kansas City – Victor Mann: 3 att, 10 yards, 1 TD
- Tulsa – J.J. Payne: 1 att, 5 yards

Receiving

- Kansas City – Robert Gill: 9 rec, 116 yards, 1 TD
- Tulsa – Troy McBroom: 10 rec, 113 yards, 3 TD

=== Week 12: vs. Spokane Shock ===
Week 12: Spokane Shock at Kansas City Command – Game summary

Quarter	1	2	3	4	Total
Shock	7	7	13	15	42
Command	13	16	13	3	45

at Sprint Center, Kansas City, Missouri

- Date: May 28
- Game time: 7:00 p.m. CDT
- Game attendance: 3,870
- Referee: Larry Smith
- Recap

Game information

- Spokane – (13:44) Alex Teems 19-yard fumble recovery (Taylor Rowan kick), Spokane 7–0
- Kansas City – (12:44) Carlton Brown 56-yard kickoff return (Brian Umstead kick), Tied 7–7
- Kansas City – (2:28) Bradly Chavez 1-yard run (Brian Umstead kick blocked), Kansas City 13–7

2nd quarter

- Kansas City – (8:35) Brian Umstead 17-yard field goal, Kansas City 16–7
- Spokane – (2:16) Emery Sammons 6-yard pass from Casey Hansen (Taylor Rowan kick), Kansas City 16–14
- Kansas City – (0:35) Robert Gill 13-yard pass from J.J. Raterink (Brian Umstead kick failed), Kansas City 22–14
- Kansas City – (0:00) Bradly Chavez 0-yard blocked field goal return (Brian Umstead kick), Kansas City 29–14

3rd quarter

- Spokane – (14:11) Raul Vijil 24-yard pass from Casey Hansen (Taylor Rowan kick blocked), Kansas City 29–20
- Kansas City – (6:34) Bret Smith 1-yard pass from J.J. Raterink (Brian Umstead kick), Kansas City 36–20
- Spokane – (5:46) Terrance Sanders 54-yard kickoff return (Taylor Rowan kick), Kansas City 36–27
- Kansas City – (1:43) Robert Gill 6-yard pass from J.J. Raterink (Brian Umstead kick failed), Kansas City 42–27

4th quarter

- Spokane – (13:43) Greg Orton 2-yard pass from Casey Hansen (Taylor Rowan kick), Kansas City 42–34
- Spokane – (4:51) Emery Sammons 3-yard pass from Casey Hansen (Casey Hansen pass), Tied 42–42
- Kansas City – (0:00) Brian Umstead 23-yard field goal, Kansas City 45–42

Passing

- Spokane – Casey Hansen: 17/35, 159 yards, 4 TD
- Kansas City – J.J. Raterink: 23/27, 207 yards, 3 TD

Rushing

- Spokane – Casey Hansen: 2 att, 0 yards
- Kansas City – J.J. Raterink: 7 att, 10 yards

Receiving

- Spokane – Raul Vijil: 4 rec, 59 yards, 1 TD
- Kansas City – Robert Gill: 6 rec, 63 yards, 2 TD

=== Week 13: vs. Chicago Rush ===
Week 13: Chicago Rush at Kansas City Command – Game summary

Quarter	1	2	3	4	Total
Rush	7	16	7	28	58
Command	0	9	14	7	30

at Sprint Center, Kansas City, Missouri

- Date: June 4
- Game time: 1:00 p.m. CDT
- Game attendance: 3,635
- Referee: Tom McCabe
- Recap

Game information

1st quarter

- Chicago – (10:26) Reggie Gray 4-yard pass from Russ Michna (Chris Gould kick), Chicago 7–0

2nd quarter

- Chicago – (13:37) Chris Gould 21-yard field goal, Chicago 10–0
- Chicago – (5:34) Derek Lee 17-yard pass from Russ Michna (Chris Gould kick), Chicago 17–0
- Kansas City – (0:15) Todd Devoe 45-yard pass from J.J. Raterink (Brian Umstead kick), Chicago 17–7
- Kansas City – (0:08) Bobby Payne safety, Chicago 17–9
- Chicago – (0:08) Jason Simpson 0-yard net recovery (Chris Gould kick failed), Chicago 23–9

3rd quarter

- Kansas City – (9:05) Robert Gill 9-yard pass from J.J. Raterink (Brian Umstead kick), Chicago 23–16
- Chicago – (6:37) Charles Dillon 34-yard pass from Russ Michna (Chris Gould kick), Chicago 30–16
- Kansas City – (1:19) Bret Smith 11-yard pass from J.J. Raterink (Brian Umstead kick), Chicago 30–23

4th quarter

- Chicago – (14:10) Derek Lee 27-yard pass from Russ Michna (Chris Gould kick), Chicago 37–23
- Chicago – (10:41) Charles Dillon 12-yard pass from Russ Michna (Chris Gould kick failed), Chicago 43–23
- Kansas City – (9:11) Bret Smith 15-yard pass from J.J. Raterink (Brian Umstead kick), Chicago 43–30
- Chicago – (5:35) Vic Hall 40-yard interception return (Chris Gould kick failed), Chicago 49–30
- Chicago – (4:08) Martin Parker safety, Chicago 51–30
- Chicago – (3:34) Reggie Gray 9-yard pass from Russ Michna (Chris Gould kick), Chicago 58–30

Passing

- Chicago – Russ Michna: 20/28, 243 yards, 6 TD
- Kansas City – J.J. Raterink: 20/39, 244 yards, 4 TD, 2 INT

Rushing

- Chicago – Russ Michna: 1 att, 11 yards
- Kansas City – J.J. Raterink: 7 att, 23 yards

Receiving

- Chicago – Charles Dillon: 6 rec, 96 yards, 2 TD
- Kansas City – Todd Devoe: 8 rec, 103 yards, 2 TD

=== Week 14: at Milwaukee Mustangs ===
Week 14: Kansas City Command at Milwaukee Mustangs – Game summary

Quarter	1	2	3	4	Total
Command	7	14	7	6	34
Mustangs	14	7	10	23	54

at Bradley Center, Milwaukee, Wisconsin

- Date: June 11
- Game time: 7:00 p.m. CDT
- Game attendance: 5,249
- Referee: Tony Cannella
- Recap

Game information

1st quarter

- Milwaukee – (6:49) Dwayne Eley Jr. 17-yard pass from R.J. Archer (Garrett Lindholm kick), Milwaukee 7–0
- Kansas City – (3:42) Steven Savoy 4-yard run (Brian Umstead kick), Tied 7–7
- Milwaukee – (1:13) Dwayne Eley Jr. 11-yard pass from R.J. Archer (Garrett Lindholm kick), Milwaukee 14–7

2nd quarter

- Kansas City – (11:39) Steven Savoy 2-yard run (Brian Umstead kick), Tied 14–14
- Kansas City – (4:56) Steven Savoy 1-yard run (Brian Umstead kick), Kansas City 21–14
- Milwaukee – (0:39) Mykel Benson 8-yard pass from R.J. Archer (Garrett Lindholm kick), Tied 21–21

3rd quarter

- Milwaukee – (10:32) Dwayne Eley Jr. 6-yard pass from R.J. Archer (Garrett Lindholm kick), Milwaukee 28–21
- Milwaukee – (5:02) Garrett Lindholm 19-yard field goal, Milwaukee 31–21
- Kansas City – (3:13) Bradly Chavez 5-yard pass from J.J. Raterink (Brian Umstead kick), Milwaukee 31–28

4th quarter

- Milwaukee – (11:35) R.J. Archer 1-yard run (Garrett Lindholm kick), Milwaukee 38–28
- Milwaukee – (6:44) Dwayne Eley Jr. 30-yard pass from R.J. Archer (Garrett Lindholm kick), Milwaukee 45–28
- Kansas City – (2:59) Steven Savoy 1-yard pass from J.J. Raterink (Brian Umstead kick failed), Milwaukee 45–34
- Milwaukee – (0:44) Garrett Lindholm 18-yard field goal, Milwaukee 48–34
- Milwaukee – (0:00) Andre Jones 51-yard interception return, Milwaukee 54–34

Passing

- Kansas City – J.J. Raterink: 16/35, 222 yards, 2 TD, 2 INT
- Milwaukee – Ryan Vena: 20/31, 236 yards, 5 TD

Rushing

- Kansas City – Steven Savoy: 5 att, 8 yards, 3 TD
- Milwaukee – Mykel Benson: 6 att, 6 yards

Receiving

- Kansas City – Steven Savoy: 5 rec, 64 yards, 1 TD
- Milwaukee – Dwayne Eley Jr.: 9 rec, 127 yards, 4 TD

=== Week 15: vs. Cleveland Gladiators ===
Week 15: Cleveland Gladiators at Kansas City Command – Game summary

Quarter	1	2	3	4	Total
Gladiators	14	7	13	7	41
Command	13	13	14	10	50

at Sprint Center, Kansas City, Missouri

- Date: June 19
- Game time: 1:00 p.m. CDT
- Game attendance: 3,938
- Referee: Larry Smith
- Recap

Game information

1st quarter

- Kansas City – (11:26) Bradley Chavez 6-yard pass from Steve Wasil (Brian Umstead kick), Kansas City 7–0
- Cleveland – (7:16) Dominick Goodman 6-yard pass from Kurt Rocco (Matt Denny kick), Tied 7–7
- Kansas City – (4:09) Bradley Chavez 12-yard pass from Steve Wasil (Brian Umstead kick failed), Kansas City 13–7
- Cleveland – (0:57) Dominick Goodman 17-yard pass from Kurt Rocco (Matt Denny kick), Cleveland 14–13

2nd quarter

- Cleveland – (6:58) Robert Redd 7-yard pass from Kurt Rocco (Matt Denny kick), Cleveland 21–13
- Kansas City – (2:04) Steve Wasil 1-yard run (Brian Umstead kick), Cleveland 21–20
- Kansas City – (0:14) Robert Gill 9-yard pass from Steve Wasil (Brian Umstead kick failed), Kansas City 26–21

3rd quarter

- Kansas City – (12:40) Bret Smith 32-yard pass from Steve Wasil (Brian Umstead kick), Kansas City 33–21
- Cleveland – (10:18) Thyron Lewis 33-yard pass from Kurt Rocco (Matt Denny kick), Kansas City 33–28
- Kansas City – (4:59) Bradley Chavez 16-yard pass from Steve Wasil (Brian Umstead kick), Kansas City 40–28
- Cleveland – (0:18) Russell Monk 3-yard run (Matt Denny kick failed), Kansas City 40–34

4th quarter

- Kansas City – (11:12) Steve Wasil 1-yard run (Brian Umstead kick), Kansas City 47–34
- Cleveland – (4:22) Kurt Rocco 6-yard run (Matt Denny kick), Kansas City 47–41
- Kansas City – (0:43) Brian Umstead 23-yard field goal, Kansas City 50–41

Passing

- Cleveland – Kurt Rocco: 20/38, 258 yards, 4 TD, 1 INT
- Kansas City – J.J. Raterink: 19/23, 243 yards, 5 TD

Rushing

- Cleveland – Russell Monk: 5 att, 10 yards, 1 TD
- Kansas City – Trey Bryant: 10 att, 39 yards

Receiving

- Cleveland – Thyron Lewis: 6 rec, 97 yards, 1 TD
- Kansas City – Bradley Chavez: 8 rec, 81 yards, 3 TD

=== Week 16: at Utah Blaze ===
Week 16: Kansas City Command at Utah Blaze – Game summary

Quarter	1	2	3	4	Total
Command	6	27	7	20	60
Blaze	13	20	14	14	61

at EnergySolutions Arena, Salt Lake City, Utah

- Date: June 24
- Game time: 7:00 p.m. CDT
- Game attendance: 9,270
- Referee: Shaun Hochuli
- Recap

Game information

1st quarter

- Utah – (13:51) Alvance Robinson 17-yard pass from Tommy Grady (Kyle Brotzman kick), Utah 7–0
- Kansas City – (8:01) Robert Gill 31-yard pass from Steve Wasil (Brian Umstead kick failed), Utah 7–6
- Utah – (5:46) Alvance Robinson 11-yard pass from Tommy Grady (Kyle Brotzman kick failed), Utah 13–6

2nd quarter

- Kansas City – (14:17) Bradley Chavez 31-yard pass from Steve Wasil (Brian Umstead kick failed), Utah 13–12
- Utah – (12:07) Jason Boone 12-yard pass from Ernest Pierce (Kyle Brotzman kick failed), Utah 19–12
- Kansas City – (9:35) Robert Gill 4-yard pass from Steve Wasil (Brian Umstead kick), Tied 19–19
- Utah – (8:03) Alvance Robinson 38-yard pass from Tommy Grady (Kyle Brotzman kick), Utah 26–19
- Kansas City – (5:01) Trey Bryant 6-yard run (Brian Umstead kick failed), Utah 26–25
- Utah – (3:28) Aaron Lesue 29-yard pass from Tommy Grady (Kyle Brotzman kick), Utah 33–25
- Kansas City – (1:40) Todd Devoe 5-yard pass from Steve Wasil (Steve Wasil rush), Tied 33–33

3rd quarter

- Kansas City – (13:12) Robert Gill 2-yard run (Brian Umstead kick), Kansas City 40–33
- Utah – (12:04) Alvance Robinson 18-yard pass from Tommy Grady (Kyle Brotzman kick), Tied 40–40
- Utah – (6:04) Aaron Lesue 2-yard pass from Tommy Grady (Kyle Brotzman kick), Utah 47–40

4th quarter

- Kansas City – (14:54) Robert Gill 7-yard pass from Steve Wasil (Brian Umstead kick), Tied 47–47
- Utah – (13:12) Aaron Lesue 17-yard pass from Tommy Grady (Kyle Brotzman kick), Utah 54–47
- Kansas City – (9:39) Bret Smith 12-yard pass from Steve Wasil (Brian Umstead kick), Tied 54–54
- Utah – (6:51) Alvance Robinson 8-yard pass from Tommy Grady (Kyle Brotzman kick), Utah 61–54
- Kansas City – (0:53) Bret Smith 6-yard pass from Steve Wasil (Brian Umstead kick blocked), Utah 61–60

Passing

- Kansas City – Chris Wallace: 30/43, 309 yards, 7 TD, 1 INT
- Utah – Tommy Grady: 18/26, 257 yards, 8 TD

Rushing

- Kansas City – Trey Bryant: 3 att, 14 yards, 1 TD
- Utah – Tommy Grady: 3 att, 3 yards

Receiving

- Kansas City – Robert Gill: 10 rec, 117 yards, 3 TD
- Utah – Alvance Robinson: 9 rec, 127 yards, 5 TD

=== Week 18: at Iowa Barnstormers ===
Week 18: Kansas City Command at Iowa Barnstormers – Game summary

Quarter	1	2	3	4	Total
Command	6	13	7	14	40
Barnstormers	7	21	14	6	48

at Wells Fargo Arena, Des Moines, Iowa

- Date: July 9
- Game time: 7:05 p.m. CDT
- Game attendance: 8,347
- Referee: Alex Kemp
- Recap

Game information

1st quarter

- Kansas City – (4:49) Robert Gill 18-yard pass from Steve Wasil (Brian Umstead kick failed), Kansas City 6–0
- Iowa – (2:56) Jesse Schmidt 14-yard pass from Brad Banks (Nick Pertuit kick), Iowa 7–6

2nd quarter

- Kansas City – (14:55) Steven Savoy 3-yard run (Brian Umstead kick), Kansas City 13–7
- Iowa – (10:10) Jesse Schmidt 6-yard pass from Brad Banks (Nick Pertuit kick), Iowa 14–13
- Iowa – (7:48) Brad Banks 2-yard run (Nick Pertuit kick), Iowa 21–13
- Kansas City – (4:39) Bret Smith 29-yard pass from Steve Wasil (Brian Umstead kick failed), Iowa 21–19
- Iowa – (0:14) Brad Banks 2-yard run (Nick Pertuit kick), Iowa 28–19

3rd quarter

- Iowa – (13:51) Jesse Schmidt 15-yard pass from Brad Banks (Nick Pertuit kick), Iowa 35–19
- Kansas City – (9:33) Steve Wasil 1-yard run (Brian Umstead kick), Iowa 35–26
- Iowa – (5:36) Marquis Hamilton 8-yard pass from Brad Banks (Nick Pertuit kick), Iowa 42–26

4th quarter

- Kansas City – (8:46) Steven Savoy 4-yard pass from Steve Wasil (Steve Wasil pass), Iowa 42–34
- Iowa – (3:47) Nick Pertuit 18-yard field goal, Iowa 45–34
- Kansas City – (2:06) Steven Savoy 13-yard pass from Steve Wasil (Steve Wasil pass failed), Iowa 45–40
- Iowa – (0:46) Nick Pertuit 23-yard field goal, Iowa 48–40

Passing

- Kansas City – Steve Wasil: 21/38, 255 yards, 4 TD, 2 INT
- Iowa – Brad Banks: 23/41, 291 yards, 4 TD, 2 INT

Rushing

- Kansas City – Trey Bryant: 1 att, 20 yards
- Iowa – Marquis Hamilton: 1 att, 25 yards

Receiving

- Kansas City – Bret Smith: 12 rec, 156 yards, 1 TD
- Iowa – Jesse Schmidt: 9 rec, 111 yards, 3 TD

=== Week 19: vs. Jacksonville Sharks ===
Week 19: Jacksonville Sharks at Kansas City Command – Game summary

Quarter	1	2	3	4	OT	Total
Sharks	6	21	0	15	6	48
Command	0	21	12	9	7	49

at Sprint Center, Kansas City, Missouri

- Date: July 15
- Game time: 7:30 p.m. CDT
- Referee: Larry Smith
- recap

Game information

1st quarter

- Jacksonville – (9:17) Jeff Hughley 4-yard pass from Aaron Garcia (Marco Capozzoli kick failed), Jacksonville 6–0

2nd quarter

- Kansas City – (9:01) Bret Smith 16-yard pass from Steve Wasil (Brian Umstead kick), Kansas City 7–6
- Jacksonville – (5:39) Jeff Hughley 14-yard pass from Aaron Garcia (Marco Capozzoli kick), Jacksonville 13–7
- Kansas City – (4:26) Brent Holmes 45-yard pass from Steve Wasil (Brian Umstead kick), Kansas City 14–13
- Jacksonville – (2:08) Sale' Key 7-yard pass from Aaron Garcia (Marco Capozzoli kick), Jacksonville 20–14
- Kansas City – (0:57) Trey Bryant 11-yard run (Brian Umstead kick), Kansas City 21–20
- Jacksonville – (0:00) Kirby Griffin 1-yard run (Marco Capozzoli kick), Jacksonville 27–21

3rd quarter

- Kansas City – (13:19) Bret Smith 24-yard pass from Steve Wasil (Brian Umstead kick failed), Tied 27–27
- Kansas City – (12:34) Bradley Chavez 3-yard net recovery (Brian Umstead kick blocked), Kansas City 33–27

4th quarter

- Kansas City – (11:34) Trey Bryant 5-yard run (Brian Umstead kick failed), Kansas City 39–27
- Jacksonville – (9:28) Jomo Wilson 27-yard pass from Aaron Garcia (Marco Capozzoli kick failed), Kansas City 39–33
- Kansas City – (3:27) Brian Umstead 19-yard field goal, Kansas City 42–33
- Jacksonville – (1:57) Sale' Key 25-yard pass from Aaron Garcia (Marco Capozzoli kick blocked), Kansas City 42–39
- Jacksonville – (0:00) Marco Capozzoli 21-yard field goal, Tied 42–42

Overtime

- Kansas City – Brent Holmes 29-yard pass from Steve Wasil (Brian Umstead kick), Kansas City 49–42
- Jacksonville – Jeff Hughley 6-yard pass from Aaron Garcia (Aaron Garcia pass failed), Kansas City 49–48

Passing

- Jacksonville – Aaron Garcia: 37/48, 419 yards, 6 TD, 2 INT
- Kansas City – Steve Wasil: 19/34, 309 yards, 4 TD, 1 INT

Rushing

- Jacksonville – Kirby Griffin: 5 att, 2 yards, 1 TD
- Kansas City – Trey Bryant: 8 att, 28 yards, 2 TD

Receiving

- Jacksonville – Jeff Hughley: 18 rec, 176 yards, 3 TD
- Kansas City – Brent Holmes: 6 rec, 127 yards, 2 TD

=== Week 20: vs. Tulsa Talons ===
Week 20: Tulsa Talons at Kansas City Command – Game summary

Quarter	1	2	3	4	Total
Talons	14	20	10	27	71
Command	7	7	14	27	55

at Sprint Center, Kansas City, Missouri

- Date: July 23
- Game time: 7:00 p.m. CDT
- Game attendance: 5,575
- Referee: Reggie Smith
- Recap

Game information

1st quarter

- Tulsa – (12:53) Troy McBroom 18-yard pass from Justin Allgood (Juan Bongarra kick), Tulsa 7–0
- Kansas City – (8:15) Steven Savoy 4-yard pass from Steve Wasil (Brian Umstead kick), Tied 7–7
- Tulsa – (2:52) J.J. Payne 1-yard fumble recovery (Juan Bongarra kick), Tulsa 14–7

2nd quarter

- Tulsa – (10:06) Jamar Ransom 1-yard run (Juan Bongarra kick), Tulsa 21–7
- Kansas City – (8:49) Brent Holmes 35-yard pass from Steve Wasil (Brian Umstead kick), Tulsa 21–14
- Tulsa – (0:55) Jamar Ransom 1-yard run (Juan Bongarra kick), Tulsa 28–14
- Tulsa – (0:13) Brandon Copeland 37-yard pass from Justin Allgood (Juan Bongarra kick failed), Tulsa 34–14

3rd quarter

- Kansas City – (11:45) Robert Gill 28-yard pass from Steve Wasil (Brian Umstead kick), Tulsa 34–21
- Tulsa – (6:22) Juan Bongarra 21-yard field goal, Tulsa 37–21
- Kansas City – (4:00) Lee Bryant 2-yard run (Brian Umstead kick), Tulsa 37–28
- Tulsa – (2:31) J.J. Payne 7-yard pass from Justin Allgood (Juan Bongarra kick), Tulsa 44–28

4th quarter

- Tulsa – (10:45) J.J. Payne 8-yard run (Juan Bongarra kick), Tulsa 51–28
- Kansas City – (9:41) Brent Holmes 33-yard pass from Steve Wasil (Brian Umstead kick), Tulsa 51–35
- Tulsa – (8:43) Craig Fulton 12-yard pass from Justin Allgood (Juan Bongarra kick), Tulsa 58–35
- Kansas City – (6:24) Brent Holmes 19-yard pass from Steve Wasil (Brian Umstead kick), Tulsa 58–42
- Tulsa – (5:48) Brandon Copeland 4-yard kickoff return (Juan Bongarra kick blocked), Tulsa 64–42
- Kansas City – (4:04) Robert Gill 45-yard pass from Steve Wasil (Steve Wasil pass failed), Tulsa 64–48
- Tulsa – (1:18) Jamar Ransom 5-yard run (Juan Bongarra kick), Tulsa 71–48
- Kansas City – (0:17) Steve Gachette 11-yard run (Brian Umstead kick), Tulsa 71–55

Passing

- Tulsa – Justin Allgood: 31/42, 310 yards, 4 TD
- Kansas City – Brad Banks: 14/26, 259 yards, 6 TD, 3 INT

Rushing

- Tulsa – Jamar Ransom: 3 att, 7 yards, 3 TD
- Kansas City – Steve Gachette: 1 att, 11 yards, 1 TD

Receiving

- Tulsa – Troy McBroom: 12 rec, 142 yards, 1 TD
- Kansas City – Brent Holmes: 6 rec, 109 yards, 3 TD
