= 2011 Tulsa Talons season =

Arena Football League team season

- Head coach: Mitch Allner
- Home stadium: BOK Center

Results
- Record: 8–10
- Division place: 3rd NC Central
- Playoffs: did not qualify

The 2011 Tulsa Talons season was the 12th season for the franchise, and the second in the Arena Football League. The team was coached by Mitch Allner and played their home games at BOK Center. The Talons finished the season 8–10, failing to qualify for the playoffs. This would be the last season for the Talons in Tulsa, Oklahoma. The franchise relocated to San Antonio, Texas following this season.

== Standings ==
Central Division
Team	W	L	PCT	PF	PA	DIV	CON	Home	Away
y-Chicago Rush	13	5	.722	957	833	6–2	9–3	7–2	6–3
x-Dallas Vigilantes	11	7	.611	1061	1007	6–2	7–5	6–3	5–4
Tulsa Talons	8	10	.444	894	899	3–5	4–7	4–5	4–5
Kansas City Command	6	12	.333	854	974	3–5	4–9	4–4	2–7
Iowa Barnstormers	5	13	.278	916	1116	2–6	5–7	4–5	1–8

y - Clinched division
x - Clinched playoff berth

== Regular season schedule ==
The season opener for the Talons was on the road against the Georgia Force on March 13. Their first home game was on March 28 against the Arizona Rattlers. They visited the Kansas City Command in their final regular season game.

Week	Day	Date	Kickoff	Opponent	Results		Location	Report
Week	Day	Date	Kickoff	Opponent	Score	Record	Location	Report
1	Sunday	March 13	3:05 p.m. CDT	at Georgia Force	L 47–53	0–1	Arena at Gwinnett Center	
2	Saturday	March 19	Noon CDT	at Dallas Vigilantes	L 40–64	0–2	American Airlines Center	
3	Monday	March 28	6:00 p.m. CDT	Arizona Rattlers	L 20–69	0–3	BOK Center	
4	Saturday	April 2	6:30 p.m. CDT	at Pittsburgh Power	W 45–22	1–3	Consol Energy Center	
5	Bye							
6	Saturday	April 16	7:00 p.m. CDT	San Jose SaberCats	L 33–42	1–4	BOK Center	
7	Saturday	April 23	7:00 p.m. CDT	Iowa Barnstormers	W 61–60	2–4	BOK Center	
8	Friday	April 29	6:30 p.m. CDT	at Cleveland Gladiators	L 30–34	2–5	Quicken Loans Arena	
9	Saturday	May 7	7:00 p.m. CDT	Chicago Rush	W 64–45	3–5	BOK Center	
10	Friday	May 13	7:00 p.m. CDT	at New Orleans VooDoo	W 48–35	4–5	New Orleans Arena	
11	Saturday	May 21	7:00 p.m. CDT	Kansas City Command	L 38–40	4–6	BOK Center	
12	Friday	May 27	7:30 p.m. CDT	at Chicago Rush	L 48–49	4–7	Allstate Arena	
13	Bye							
14	Saturday	June 11	7:00 p.m. CDT	Utah Blaze	W 81–51	5–7	BOK Center	
15	Friday	June 17	6:05 p.m. CDT	at Philadelphia Soul	W 48–42	6–7	Wells Fargo Center	
16	Saturday	June 25	7:00 p.m. CDT	Dallas Vigilantes	L 48–55	6–8	BOK Center	
17	Friday	July 1	7:05 p.m. CDT	at Iowa Barnstormers	L 53–55	6–9	Wells Fargo Arena	
18	Saturday	July 9	7:00 p.m. CDT	Tampa Bay Storm	W 70–33	7–9	BOK Center	
19	Saturday	July 16	7:00 p.m. CDT	Orlando Predators	L 49–85	7–10	BOK Center	
20	Saturday	July 23	7:00 p.m. CDT	at Kansas City Command	W 71–55	8–10	Sprint Center	

== Regular season ==
=== Week 1: at Georgia Force ===
Week 1: Tulsa Talons at Georgia Force – Game summary

Quarter	1	2	3	4	Total
Talons	6	13	7	21	47
Force	14	13	13	13	53

at Arena at Gwinnett Center, Duluth, Georgia

- Date: March 13
- Game time: 3:05 p.m. CDT
- Game attendance: 4,385
- Recap

Game information

1st quarter

- Georgia – (8:55) Benji McDowell 1-yard run (Carlos Martinez kick), Georgia 7–0
- Tulsa – (6:18) Bobby Reid 6-yard run (Juan Bongarra kick failed), Georgia 7–6
- Georgia – (2:20) Michael Johnson 6-yard pass from Brett Elliot (Carlos Martinez kick), Georgia 14–6

2nd quarter

- Georgia – (10:32) Larry Shipp Jr. 22-yard pass from Brett Elliot (Carlos Martinez kick failed), Georgia 20–6
- Tulsa – (8:38) Bobby Reid 39-yard run (Juan Bongarra kick), Georgia 20–13
- Georgia – (7:42) C.J. Johnson 56-yard kickoff return (Carlos Martinez kick), Georgia 27–13
- Tulsa – (3:36) Trent Shelton 14-yard pass from Bobby Reid (Juan Bongarra kick failed), Georgia 27–19

3rd quarter

- Georgia – (9:50) Benji McDowell 1-yard run (Carlos Martinez kick failed), Georgia 33–19
- Tulsa – (5:45) Bobby Reid 1-yard run (Juan Bongarra kick), Georgia 33–26
- Georgia – (2:18) Larry Shipp Jr. 4-yard run (Carlos Martinez kick), Georgia 40–26

4th quarter

- Tulsa – (14:50) Bobby Reid 34-yard run (Juan Bongarra kick), Georgia 40–33
- Georgia – (10:24) Maurice Purify 42-yard pass from Brett Elliot (Carlos Martinez kick), Georgia 47–33
- Georgia – (5:40) Kevin McAlmont 29-yard pass from Michael Johnson (Carlos Martinez kick blocked), Georgia 53–33
- Tulsa – (1:55) Trent Shelton 23-yard pass from Bobby Reid (Juan Bongarra kick), Georgia 53–40
- Tulsa – (0:06) Trent Shelton 31-yard pass from Bobby Reid (Juan Bongarra kick), Georgia 53–47

Passing

- Tulsa – Bobby Reid: 21/32, 218 yards, 3 TD
- Georgia – Brett Elliot: 23/33, 280 yards, 3 TD

Rushing

- Tulsa – Bobby Reid: 6 att, 93 yards, 4 TD
- Georgia – Benji McDowell: 4 att, 2 yards, 2 TD

Receiving

- Tulsa – Trent Shelton: 8 rec, 109 yards, 3 TD
- Georgia – C.J. Johnson: 10 rec, 107 yards

=== Week 2: at Dallas Vigilantes ===
Week 2: Tulsa Talons at Dallas Vigilantes – Game summary

Quarter	1	2	3	4	Total
Talons	0	33	0	7	40
Vigilantes	14	21	7	22	64

at American Airlines Center, Dallas, Texas

- Date: March 19
- Game time: Noon CDT
- Game attendance: 7,177
- Referee: Scott Vaughan

Game information

1st quarter

- Dallas – (9:21) Derrick Ross 1-yard run (Remy Hamilton kick), Dallas 7–0
- Dallas – (2:20) Anthony Jones 12-yard pass from Dan Raudabaugh (Remy Hamilton kick), Dallas 14–0

2nd quarter

- Tulsa – (14:25) Bobby Reid 5-yard run (Juan Bongarra kick failed), Dallas 14–6
- Dallas – (11:36) Anthony Jones 24-yard pass from Dan Raudabaugh (Remy Hamilton kick), Dallas 21–6
- Tulsa – (10:53) Fred Shaw 8-yard kickoff return (Juan Bongarra kick), Dallas 21–13
- Tulsa – (8:23) Brandon Copeland 16-yard pass from Bobby Reid (Jamar Ransom rush), Tied 21–21
- Dallas – (5:11) Matt Fields 22-yard pass from Dan Raudabaugh (Remy Hamilton kick), Dallas 28–21
- Tulsa – (2:49) Bobby Reid 27-yard run (Juan Bongarra kick failed), Dallas 28–27
- Dallas – (1:43) DeAndrew Rubin 44-yard pass from Dan Raudabaugh (Remy Hamilton kick), Dallas 35–27
- Tulsa – (0:14) Victor Degrate 3-yard pass from Bobby Reid (Bobby Reid rush failed), Dallas 35–33

3rd quarter

- Dallas – (7:09) Matt Fields 14-yard pass from Dan Raudabaugh (Remy Hamilton kick), Dallas 42–33

4th quarter

- Tulsa – (11:54) Bobby Reid 16-yard run (Juan Bongarra kick), Dallas 42–40
- Dallas – (10:05) Matt Fields 33-yard pass from Dan Raudabaugh (Remy Hamilton kick), Dallas 49–40
- Dallas – (8:36) Team safety, Dallas 51–40
- Dallas – (5:01) Matt Fields 20-yard pass from Dan Raudabaugh (Remy Hamilton kick failed), Dallas 57–40
- Dallas – (2:12) DeAndrew Rubin 2-yard pass from Dan Raudabaugh (Remy Hamilton kick), Dallas 64–40

Passing

- Tulsa – Bobby Reid: 17/32, 173 yards, 2 TD, 1 INT
- Dallas – Dan Raudabaugh: 21/38, 297 yards, 8 TD, 1 INT

Rushing

- Tulsa – Bobby Reid: 7 att, 84 yards, 3 TD
- Dallas – Derrick Ross: 7 att, 24 yards, 1 TD

Receiving

- Tulsa – Bryan Paysinger: 7 rec, 71 yards
- Dallas – Matt Fields: 6 rec, 123 yards, 4 TD

=== Week 3: vs. Arizona Rattlers ===
Week 3: Arizona Rattlers at Tulsa Talons – Game summary

Quarter	1	2	3	4	Total
Rattlers	19	23	7	20	69
Talons	0	0	6	14	20

at BOK Center, Tulsa, Oklahoma

- Date: March 28
- Game time: 6:00 p.m. CDT
- Game attendance: 9,311
- Referee: Joe Pester
- Recap

Game information

1st quarter

- Arizona – (10:28) Odie Armstrong 3-yard run (Joe Schroeder kick failed), Arizona 6–0
- Arizona – (2:43) Nate Forse 3-yard pass from Nick Davila (Joe Schroeder kick), Arizona 13–0
- Arizona – (0:09) Kevin McCullough 10-yard interception return (Joe Schroeder kick failed), Arizona 19–0

2nd quarter

- Arizona – (12:23) Trandon Harvey 38-yard pass from Nick Davila (Joe Schroeder kick), Arizona 26–0
- Arizona – (10:27) Team safety, Arizona 28–0
- Arizona – (8:04) Rod Windsor 5-yard pass from Nick Davila (Joe Schroeder kick), Arizona 35–0
- Arizona – (0:20) Trandon Harvey 15-yard pass from Nick Davila (Joe Schroeder kick), Arizona 42–0

3rd quarter

- Tulsa – (8:45) T.J. Williams 6-yard pass from Bobby Reid (Juan Bongarra kick failed), Arizona 42–6
- Arizona – (5:38) Trandon Harvey 32-yard pass from Trevor Harris (Joe Schroeder kick), Arizona 49–6

4th quarter

- Tulsa – (14:52) Jamar Ransom 2-yard run (Jamar Ransom rush), Arizona 49–14
- Arizona – (9:59) Trandon Harvey 12-yard pass from Trevor Harris (Joe Schroeder kick), Arizona 56–14
- Arizona – (7:22) Odie Armstrong 1-yard run (Joe Schroeder kick failed), Arizona 62–14
- Tulsa – (0:40) T.J. Williams 28-yard pass from Matt Baussener (Juan Bongarra rush failed), Arizona 62–20
- Arizona – (0:24) Jason Geathers 15-yard pass from Trevor Harris (Joe Schroeder kick), Arizona 69–20

Passing

- Arizona – Nick Davila: 15/22, 158 yards, 4 TD
- Tulsa – Aaron Garcia: 15/32, 108 yards, 2 TD, 4 INT

Rushing

- Arizona – Odie Armstrong: 7 att, 10 yards, 1 TD
- Tulsa – Bobby Reid: 5 att, 29 yards

Receiving

- Arizona – Trandon Harvey: 11 rec, 150 yards, 4 TD
- Tulsa – T.J. Williams: 8 rec, 92 yards, 2 TD

=== Week 4: at Pittsburgh Power ===
Week 4: Tulsa Talons at Pittsburgh Power – Game summary

Quarter	1	2	3	4	Total
Talons	7	7	10	21	45
Power	0	14	0	8	22

at Consol Energy Center, Pittsburgh, Pennsylvania

- Date: April 2
- Game time: 6:30 p.m. CDT
- Game attendance: 9,925
- Recap

Game information

1st quarter

- Tulsa – (5:33) Bobby Reid 1-yard run (Juan Bongarra kick), Tulsa 7–0

2nd quarter

- Tulsa – (14:55) Matt Bassuener 6-yard run (Juan Bongarra kick), Tulsa 14–0
- Pittsburgh – (12:19) Josh Rue 14-yard pass from Kevin McCabe (Paul Edinger kick), Tulsa 14–7
- Pittsburgh – (1:49) Michael Washington 5-yard pass from Kevin McCabe (Paul Edinger kick), Tied 14–14

3rd quarter

- Tulsa – (6:36) Juan Bongarra 21-yard field goal, Tulsa 17–14
- Tulsa – (5:26) Troy McBroom 9-yard pass from Matt Bassuener (Juan Bongarra kick), Tulsa 24–14

4th quarter

- Tulsa – (9:17) Troy McBroom 9-yard pass from Matt Bassuener (Juan Bongarra kick), Tulsa 31–14
- Tulsa – (7:52) Bobby Reid 2-yard run (Juan Bongarra kick), Tulsa 38–14
- Pittsburgh – (4:11) Michael Washington 22-yard pass from Anthony Morelli (Anthony Morelli run), Tulsa 38–22
- Tulsa – (1:32) J.C. Neal 11-yard pass from Matt Bassuener (Juan Bongarra kick), Tulsa 45–22

Passing

- Tulsa – Matt Bassuener: 22/36, 199 yards, 3 TD
- Pittsburgh – Anthony Morelli: 11/17, 114 yards, 1 TD, 1 INT

Rushing

- Tulsa – Matt Bassuener: 11 att, 53 yards, 1 TD
- Pittsburgh – Kevin McCabe: 1 att, 14 yards

Receiving

- Tulsa – Troy McBroom: 7 rec, 81 yards, 2 TD
- Pittsburgh – Michael Washington: 6 rec, 58 yards, 2 TD

=== Week 6: vs. San Jose SaberCats ===
Week 6: San Jose SaberCats at Tulsa Talons – Game summary

Quarter	1	2	3	4	Total
SaberCats	7	7	21	7	42
Talons	14	10	3	6	33

at BOK Center, Tulsa, Oklahoma

- Date: April 16
- Game time: 7:00 p.m. CDT
- Game attendance: 4,747
- Referee: Steve Strimling
- Recap

Game information

1st quarter

- Tulsa – (10:16) Darrell Davis 3-yard pass from Matt Bassunener (Juan Bongarra kick), Tulsa 7–0
- Tulsa – (3:58) Troy McBroom 8-yard pass from Matt Bassuener (Juan Bongarra kick), Tulsa 14–0
- San Jose – (2:45) Nicherin Flowers 29-yard pass from Mark Grieb (Juan Gamboa kick), Tulsa 14–7

2nd quarter

- Tulsa – (9:42) Al Hunt 8-yard pass from Matt Bassuener (Juan Bongarra kick), Tulsa 21–7
- San Jose – (2:40) Samora Goodson 9-yard pass from Mark Grieb (Juan Gamboa kick), Tulsa 21–14
- Tulsa – (0:29) Juan Bongarra 26-yard field goal, Tulsa 24–14

3rd quarter

- San Jose – (12:33) Samora Goodson 25-yard pass from Mark Grieb (Juan Gamboa kick), Tulsa 24–21
- San Jose – (11:01) Chad Cook 2-yard run (Juan Gamboa kick), San Jose 28–24
- Tulsa – (4:07) Juan Bongarra 29-yard field goal, San Jose 28–27
- San Jose – (0:56) Samora Goodson 7-yard pass from Mark Grieb (Juan Gamboa kick), San Jose 35–27

4th quarter

- Tulsa – (7:54) Troy McBroom 6-yard pass from Matt Bassuener (Matt Bassuener pass failed), San Jose 35–33
- San Jose – (2:05) Chad Cook 3-yard run (Juan Gamboa kick), San Jose 42–33

Passing

- San Jose – Mark Grieb: 25/32, 302 yards, 4 TD, 2 INT
- Tulsa – Matt Bassuener: 22/43, 265 yards, 4 TD, 2 INT

Rushing

- San Jose – Chad Cook: 7 att, 19 yards, 2 TD
- Tulsa – Matt Bassuener: 4 att, 10 yards

Receiving

- San Jose – Samora Goodson: 10 rec, 145 yards, 3 TD
- Tulsa – Troy McBroom: 13 rec, 177 yards, 2 TD

=== Week 7: vs. Iowa Barnstormers ===
Week 7: Iowa Barnstormers at Tulsa Talons – Game summary

Quarter	1	2	3	4	Total
Barnstormers	13	14	13	20	60
Talons	21	7	14	19	61

at BOK Center, Tulsa, Oklahoma

- Date: April 23
- Game time: 7:00 p.m. CDT
- Game attendance: 5,385
- Referee: Joe Pester
- Recap

Game information

1st quarter

- Tulsa – (10:38) Troy McBroom 12-yard pass from Matt Bassuener (Juan Bongarra kick), Tulsa 7–0
- Iowa – (8:20) Todd Blythe 30-yard pass from Brad Banks (Garrett Morgan kick), Tied 7–7
- Tulsa – (6:38) Brandon Copeland 25-yard pass from Matt Bassuener (Juan Bongarra kick), Tulsa 14–7
- Iowa – (2:22) Jesse Schmidt 18-yard pass from Brad Banks (Garrett Morgan kick failed), Tulsa 14–13
- Tulsa – (1:13) Brandon Copeland 21-yard pass from Matt Bassuener (Juan Bongarra kick), Tulsa 21–13

2nd quarter

- Iowa – (10:40) Todd Blythe 5-yard pass from Brad Banks (Garrett Morgan kick), Tulsa 21–20
- Tulsa – (7:44) Troy McBroom 24-yard pass from Matt Bassuener (Juan Bongarra kick), Tulsa 28–20
- Iowa – (3:35) Todd Blythe 5-yard pass from Brad Banks (Garrett Morgan kick), Tulsa 28–27

3rd quarter

- Iowa – (12:08) Brad Banks 5-yard run (Garrett Morgan kick), Iowa 34–28
- Tulsa – (8:18) Troy McBroom 15-yard pass from Matt Bassuener (Juan Bongarra kick), Tulsa 35–34
- Iowa – (6:03) Todd Blythe 22-yard pass from Brad Banks (Garrett Morgan kick failed), Iowa 40–35
- Tulsa – (1:57) Al Hunt 2-yard run (Juan Bongarra kick), Tulsa 42–40

4th quarter

- Iowa – (14:22) Jesse Schmidt 7-yard pass from Brad Banks (Brad Banks pass failed), Iowa 46–42
- Iowa – (12:40) Jesse Schmidt 17-yard pass from Brad Banks (Garrett Morgan kick), Iowa 53–42
- Tulsa – (7:05) Matt Bassuener 1-yard run (Matt Bassuener rush), Iowa 53–50
- Iowa – (5:45) Larry Beavers 10-yard pass from Brad Banks (Garrett Morgan kick), Iowa 60–50
- Tulsa – (1:33) Matt Bassuener 1-yard run (Matt Bassuener pass), Iowa 60–58
- Tulsa – (0:00) Juan Bongarra 42-yard field goal, Tulsa 61–60

Passing

- Iowa – Brad Banks: 24/33, 324 yards, 8 TD
- Tulsa – Matt Bassuener: 27/39, 299 yards, 5 TD, 2 INT

Rushing

- Iowa – Brad Banks: 4 att, 14 yards, 1 TD
- Tulsa – Matt Bassuener: 6 att, 51 yards, 2 TD

Receiving

- Iowa – Jesse Schmidt: 13 rec, 154 yards, 3 TD
- Tulsa – Troy McBroom: 13 rec, 144 yards, 3 TD

=== Week 8: at Cleveland Gladiators ===
Week 8: Tulsa Talons at Cleveland Gladiators – Game summary

Quarter	1	2	3	4	Total
Talons	7	16	7	0	30
Gladiators	14	7	0	13	34

at Quicken Loans Arena, Cleveland, Ohio

- Date: April 29
- Game time: 6:30 p.m. CDT
- Game attendance: 5,109
- Referee: Alex Kemp

Game information

1st quarter

- Cleveland – (11:05) Robert Redd 2-yard pass from Kurt Rocco (Matt Denny kick), Cleveland 7–0
- Tulsa – (6:32) Matt Bassuener 2-yard run (Juan Bongarra kick), Tied 7–7
- Cleveland – (0:05) Troy Bergeron 4-yard pass from Kurt Rocco (Matt Denny kick), Cleveland 14–7

2nd quarter

- Tulsa – (12:43) Anthony Bolden 10-yard pass from Matt Bassuener (Juan Bongarra kick), Tied 14–14
- Cleveland – (8:56) Robert Redd 4-yard pass from Kurt Rocco (Matt Denny kick), Cleveland 21–14
- Tulsa – (5:53) Al Hunt 12-yard pass from Matt Bassuener (Juan Bongarra kick), Tied 21–21
- Tulsa – (4:37) Team safety, Tulsa 23–21

3rd quarter

- Tulsa – (7:27) Darrell Davis 4-yard pass from Matt Bassuener (Juan Bongarra kick), Tulsa 30–21

4th quarter

- Cleveland – (14:53) Robert Redd 7-yard pass from Dan Whalen (Matt Denny kick), Tulsa 30–28
- Cleveland – (0:33) Russell Monk 4-yard run (Matt Denny kick failed), Cleveland 34–30

Passing

- Tulsa – Matt Bassuener: 23/40, 246 yards, 3 TD, 1 INT
- Cleveland – Kurt Rocco: 12/21, 136 yards, 3 TD

Rushing

- Tulsa – Matt Bassuener: 3 att, 20 yards, 1 TD
- Cleveland – Dan Whalen: 4 att, 28 yards

Receiving

- Tulsa – Brandon Copeland: 8 rec, 101 yards
- Cleveland – Dominick Goodman: 7 rec, 91 yards

=== Week 9: vs. Chicago Rush ===
Week 9: Chicago Rush at Tulsa Talons – Game summary

Quarter	1	2	3	4	Total
Rush	14	14	7	10	45
Talons	10	24	20	10	64

at BOK Center, Tulsa, Oklahoma

- Date: May 7
- Game time: 7:00 p.m. CDT
- Referee: Shawn Hochuli
- Recap

Game information

1st quarter

- Chicago – (12:44) Marcus Waugh 2-yard run (Chris Gould kick), Chicago 7–0
- Chicago – (11:27) Jason Simpson 9-yard interception return (Chris Gould kick), Chicago 14–0
- Tulsa – (6:25) Matt Bassuener 1-yard run (Juan Bongarra kick), Chicago 14–7
- Tulsa – (0:59) Juan Bongarra 27-yard field goal, Chicago 14–10

2nd quarter

- Tulsa – (12:10) Troy McBroom 34-yard pass from Matt Bassuener (Juan Bongarra kick), Tulsa 17–14
- Tulsa – (8:02) Juan Bongarra 33-yard field goal, Tulsa 20–14
- Tulsa – (6:50) Matt Bassuener 12-yard run (Juan Bongarra kick), Tulsa 27–14
- Chicago – (5:11) Reggie Gray 43-yard pass from Russ Michna (Chris Gould kick), Tulsa 27–21
- Chicago – (0:15) Charles Dillon 24-yard pass from Russ Michna (Chris Gould kick), Chicago 28–27
- Tulsa – (0:06) Troy McBroom 18-yard pass from Matt Bassuener (Juan Bongarra kick), Tulsa 34–28

3rd quarter

- Tulsa – (11:50) Matt Bassuener 8-yard run (Juan Bongarra kick failed), Tulsa 40–28
- Tulsa – (7:47) Jamar Ransom 2-yard run (Juan Bongarra kick), Tulsa 47–28
- Chicago – (6:45) Reggie Gray 34-yard pass from Russ Michna (Chris Gould kick), Tulsa 47–35
- Tulsa – (3:47) Matt Bassuener 7-yard run (Juan Bongarra kick), Tulsa 54–35

4th quarter

- Tulsa – (14:50) Trent Shelton 30-yard pass from Matt Bassuener (Juan Bongarra kick), Tulsa 61–35
- Tulsa – (6:34) Juan Bongarra 31-yard field goal, Tulsa 64–35
- Chicago – (3:42) Reggie Gray 7-yard pass from Dominick Randolph (Dominick Randolph pass), Tulsa 64–43
- Chicago – (2:14) Team safety, Tulsa 64–45

Passing

- Chicago – Russ Michna: 17/26, 248 yards, 3 TD, 1 INT
- Tulsa – Matt Bassuener: 17/31, 234 yards, 3 TD, 3 INT

Rushing

- Chicago – Johnie Kirton: 3 att, 10 yards
- Tulsa – Matt Bassuener: 7 att, 33 yards, 4 TD

Receiving

- Chicago – Reggie Gray: 7 rec, 142 yards, 3 TD
- Tulsa – Troy McBroom: 13 rec, 144 yards, 3 TD

=== Week 10: at New Orleans VooDoo ===
Week 10: Tulsa Talons at New Orleans VooDoo – Game summary

Quarter	1	2	3	4	Total
Talons	7	17	7	17	48
VooDoo	0	21	7	7	35

at New Orleans Arena, New Orleans, Louisiana

- Date: May 13
- Game time: 7:00 p.m. CDT
- Game attendance: 8,127
- Referee: Scott Vaughn

Game information

1st quarter

- Tulsa – (6:55) Brandon Copeland 8-yard pass from Matt Bassuener (Juan Bongarra kick), Tulsa 7–0

2nd quarter

- Tulsa – (14:54) Matt Bassuener 1-yard run (Juan Bongarra kick), Tulsa 14–0
- New Orleans – (10:18) P.J. Berry 7-yard pass from Danny Wimprine (Jonathan Ruffin kick), Tulsa 14–7
- New Orleans – (4:42) P.J. Berry 14-yard pass from Danny Wimprine (Jonathan Ruffin kick), Tied 14–14
- Tulsa – (1:06) Brandon Copeland 34-yard pass from Matt Bassuener (Juan Bongarra kick), Tulsa 21–14
- New Orleans – (0:45) P.J. Berry 7-yard pass from Danny Wimprine (Jonathan Ruffin kick), Tied 21–21
- Tulsa – (0:06) Juan Bongarra 24-yard field goal, Tulsa 24–21

3rd quarter

- Tulsa – (8:34) Troy McBroom 10-yard pass from Matt Bassuener (Juan Bongarra kick), Tulsa 31–21
- New Orleans – (1:57) James Jordan 3-yard pass from Danny Wimprine (Jonathan Ruffin kick), Tulsa 31–28

4th quarter

- Tulsa – (13:05) Brandon Copeland 14-yard pass from Matt Bassuener (Juan Bongarra kick), Tulsa 38–28
- New Orleans – (10:03) P.J. Berry 30-yard pass from Danny Wimprine (Jonathan Ruffin kick), Tulsa 38–35
- Tulsa – (5:12) Matt Bassuener 1-yard run (Juan Bongarra kick), Tulsa 45–35
- Tulsa – (0:48) Juan Bongarra 16-yard field goal, Tulsa 48–35

Passing

- Tulsa – Matt Bassuener: 24/35, 225 yards, 4 TD, 1 INT
- New Orleans – Danny Wimprine: 26/47, 234 yards, 5 TD, 1 INT

Rushing

- Tulsa – Matt Bassuener: 14 att, 55 yards, 2 TD
- New Orleans – Tom Taggart: 3 att, 7 yards

Receiving

- Tulsa – Troy McBroom: 10 rec, 96 yards, 3 TD
- New Orleans – James Jordan: 13 rec, 129 yards, 4 TD

=== Week 11: vs. Kansas City Command ===
Week 11: Kansas City Command at Tulsa Talons – Game summary

Quarter	1	2	3	4	Total
Command	7	6	7	20	40
Talons	7	7	10	14	38

at BOK Center, Tulsa, Oklahoma

- Date: May 21
- Game time: 7:00 p.m. CDT
- Referee: Joe Pester

Game information

1st quarter

- Tulsa – (8:46) Troy McBroom 13-yard pass from Matt Bassuener (Juan Bongarra kick), Tulsa 7–0
- Kansas City – (6:36) Robert Gill 5-yard pass from J.J. Raterink (Brian Umstead kick), Tied 7–7

2nd quarter

- Kansas City – (10:35) Victor Mann 5-yard run (Brian Umstead kick failed), Kansas City 13–7
- Tulsa – (5:15) Troy McBroom 8-yard pass from Matt Bassuener (Juan Bongarra kick), Tulsa 14–13

3rd quarter

- Tulsa – (8:24) Juan Bongarra 33-yard field goal, Tulsa 17–13
- Kansas City – (8:02) Todd Devoe 45-yard pass from J.J. Raterink (Brian Umstead kick), Kansas City 20–17
- Tulsa – (4:40) Troy McBroom 16-yard pass from Matt Bassuener (Juan Bongarra kick), Tulsa 24–20

4th quarter

- Tulsa – (14:11) Trent Shelton 33-yard pass from Matt Bassuener (Juan Bongarra kick), Tulsa 31–20
- Kansas City – (11:19) Bradly Chavez 9-yard pass from J.J. Raterink (Brian Umstead kick), Tulsa 31–27
- Kansas City – (7:37) Todd Devoe 2-yard pass from J.J. Raterink (Brian Umstead kick), Kansas City 34–31
- Tulsa – (1:37) Jamar Ransom 1-yard run (Juan Bongarra kick), Tulsa 38–34
- Kansas City – (0:00) Bradly Chavez 16-yard pass from J.J. Raterink (Team pass failed), Kansas City 40–38

Passing

- Kansas City – J.J. Raterink: 23/38, 287 yards, 5 TD, 1 INT
- Tulsa – Matt Bassuener: 24/41, 263 yards, 4 TD, 2 INT

Rushing

- Kansas City – Victor Mann: 3 att, 10 yards, 1 TD
- Tulsa – J.J. Payne: 1 att, 5 yards

Receiving

- Kansas City – Robert Gill: 9 rec, 116 yards, 1 TD
- Tulsa – Troy McBroom: 10 rec, 113 yards, 3 TD

=== Week 12: at Chicago Rush ===
Week 12: Tulsa Talons at Chicago Rush – Game summary

Quarter	1	2	3	4	Total
Talons	6	20	7	15	48
Rush	21	7	14	7	49

at Allstate Arena, Rosemont, Illinois

- Date: May 27
- Game time: 7:30 p.m. CDT
- Game attendance: 7,350
- Referee: Tony Cannella

Game information

1st quarter

- Chicago – (9:26) Reggie Gray 4-yard pass from Russ Michna (Chris Gould kick), Chicago 7–0
- Tulsa – (6:38) Matt Bassuener 1-yard run (Juan Bongarra kick failed), Chicago 7–6
- Chicago – (5:38) Reggie Gray 58-yard kickoff return (Chris Gould kick), Chicago 14–6
- Chicago – (1:35) J.J. McKelvey 8-yard pass from Russ Michna (Chris Gould kick), Chicago 21–6

2nd quarter

- Tulsa – (10:41) Troy McBroom 15-yard pass from Justin Allgood (Juan Bongarra kick), Chicago 21–13
- Chicago – (8:03) J.J. McKelvey 24-yard pass from Russ Michna (Chris Gould kick), Chicago 28–13
- Tulsa – (1:00) J.J. Payne 1-yard run (Matt Bassuener pass failed), Chicago 28–19
- Tulsa – (0:13) Brandon Copeland 17-yard pass from Justin Allgood (Juan Bongarra kick), Chicago 28–26

3rd quarter

- Tulsa – (13:26) Trent Shelton 20-yard pass from Justin Allgood (Juan Bongarra kick), Tulsa 33–28
- Chicago – (8:11) Charles Dillon 14-yard pass from Russ Michna (Chris Gould kick), Chicago 35–33
- Chicago – (1:27) J.J. McKelvey 13-yard pass from Russ Michna (Chris Gould kick), Chicago 42–33

4th quarter

- Tulsa – (13:20) Troy McBroom 7-yard pass from Justin Allgood (Juan Bongarra kick), Chicago 42–40
- Tulsa – (3:59) Trent Shelton 14-yard pass from Justin Allgood (Justin Allgood pass), Tulsa 48–42
- Chicago – (0:00) Russ Michna 1-yard run (Chris Gould kick), Chicago 49–48

Passing

- Tulsa – Justin Allgood: 21/40, 233 yards, 5 TD, 3 INT
- Chicago – Russ Michna: 19/32, 201 yards, 5 TD, 1 INT

Rushing

- Tulsa – J.J. Payne: 5 att, 11 yards, 1 TD
- Chicago – Russ Michna: 4 att, 4 yards, 1 TD

Receiving

- Tulsa – Troy McBroom: 10 rec, 126 yards, 2 TD
- Chicago – J.J. McKelvey: 9 rec, 88 yards, 3 TD

=== Week 14: vs. Utah Blaze ===
Week 14: Utah Blaze at Tulsa Talons – Game summary

Quarter	1	2	3	4	Total
Blaze	13	20	12	6	51
Talons	6	35	26	14	81

at BOK Center, Tulsa, Oklahoma

- Date: June 11
- Game time: 7:00 p.m. CDT
- Game attendance: 4,940
- Referee: Dave Cutaia
- Recap

Game information

1st quarter

- Utah – (14:40) Chris Bocage 55-yard kickoff return (Andrew Aguila kick), Utah 7–0
- Tulsa – (8:32) Troy McBroom 5-yard pass from Justin Allgood (Juan Bongarra kick failed), Utah 7–6
- Utah – (4:40) Ernest Pierce 9-yard pass from Tommy Grady (Andrew Aguila kick failed), Utah 13–6

2nd quarter

- Tulsa – (13:46) J.J. Payne 3-yard run (Juan Bongarra kick), Tied 13–13
- Tulsa – (11:17) J.C. Neal 52-yard interception return (Juan Bongarra kick), Tulsa 20–13
- Utah – (10:26) Justin Ore 45-yard pass from Tommy Grady (Andrew Aguila kick), Tied 20–20
- Tulsa – (8:55) Troy McBroom 9-yard pass from Justin Allgood (Juan Bongarra kick), Tulsa 27–20
- Utah – (5:49) Chris Bocage 9-yard pass from Tommy Grady (Andrew Aguila kick), Tied 27–27
- Utah – (3:49) Justin Ore 28-yard pass from Tommy Grady (Andrew Aguila kick failed), Utah 33–27
- Tulsa – (0:55) Al Hunt 7-yard pass from Justin Allgood (Juan Bongarra kick), Tulsa 34–33
- Tulsa – (0:00) Jamar Ransom 1-yard run (Juan Bongarra kick), Tulsa 41–33

3rd quarter

- Tulsa – (12:29) Troy McBroom 17-yard pass from Justin Allgood (Juan Bongarra kick failed), Tulsa 47–33
- Utah – (9:17) Justin Ore 7-yard pass from Tommy Grady (Andrew Aguila kick blocked), Tulsa 47–39
- Tulsa – (6:20) Troy McBroom 16-yard pass from Justin Allgood (Juan Bongarra kick), Tulsa 54–39
- Tulsa – (4:01) Jamar Ransom 4-yard fumble recovery (Juan Bongarra kick), Tulsa 61–39
- Utah – (1:34) Ernest Pierce 28-yard pass from Tommy Grady (Tommy Grady pass failed), Tulsa 61–45
- Tulsa – (0:28) J.C. Neal 8-yard kickoff return (Juan Bongarra kick failed), Tulsa 67–45

4th quarter

- Utah – (14:12) Ernest Pierce 4-yard pass from Tommy Grady (Tommy Grady pass intercepted), Tulsa 67–51
- Tulsa – (12:20) Trent Shelton 25-yard pass from Justin Allgood (Juan Bongarra kick), Tulsa 74–51
- Tulsa – (10:31) J.C. Neal 43-yard interception return (Juan Bongarra kick), Tulsa 81–51

Passing

- Utah – Tommy Grady: 26/36, 344 yards, 7 TD, 2 INT
- Tulsa – Justin Allgood: 24/34, 254 yards, 6 TD

Rushing

- Utah – Jordan Rasmussen: 1 att, 1 yard
- Tulsa – J.J. Payne: 5 att, 17 yards, 1 TD

Receiving

- Utah – Justin Ore: 13 rec, 199 yards, 3 TD
- Tulsa – Troy McBroom: 12 rec, 130 yards, 4 TD

=== Week 15: at Philadelphia Soul ===
Week 15: Tulsa Talons at Philadelphia Soul – Game summary

Quarter	1	2	3	4	Total
Talons	6	21	7	14	48
Soul	7	7	14	14	42

at Wells Fargo Center, Philadelphia, Pennsylvania

- Date: June 17
- Game time: 6:05 p.m. CDT
- Game attendance: 8,140
- Referee: Jim Corpora

Game information

1st quarter

- Philadelphia – (12:17) Mike Brown 36-yard pass from Brandon Kirsch (Jon Strictsky kick), Philadelphia 7–0
- Tulsa – (6:38) Al Hunt 4-yard pass from Justin Allgood (Juan Bongarra kick failed), Philadelphia 7–6

2nd quarter

- Tulsa – (7:10) J.C. Neal 50-yard interception return (Juan Bongarra kick), Tulsa 13–7
- Tulsa – (3:41) Al Hunt 6-yard pass from Justin Allgood (Juan Bongarra kick), Tulsa 20–7
- Philadelphia – (0:38) Mike Brown 29-yard pass from Brandon Kirsch (Jon Strictsky kick), Tulsa 20–14
- Tulsa – (0:22) Troy McBroom 42-yard pass from Justin Allgood (Juan Bongarra kick), Tulsa 27–14

3rd quarter

- Philadelphia – (11:20) Syvelle Newton 19-yard pass from Ryan Vena (Jon Strictsky kick), Tulsa 27–21
- Tulsa – (7:05) Troy McBroom 31-yard pass from Justin Allgood (Juan Bongarra kick), Tulsa 34–21
- Philadelphia – (1:44) Syvelle Newton 5-yard pass from Ryan Vena (Jon Strictsky kick), Tulsa 34–28

4th quarter

- Tulsa – (12:41) Troy McBroom 8-yard pass from Justin Allgood (Juan Bongarra kick), Tulsa 41–28
- Philadelphia – (7:25) Syvelle Newton 27-yard pass from Ryan Vena (Jon Strictsky kick), Tulsa 41–35
- Tulsa – (3:32) Brandon Copeland 26-yard pass from Justin Allgood (Juan Bongarra kick), Tulsa 48–35
- Philadelphia – (0:53) Syvelle Newton 31-yard pass from Ryan Vena (Jon Strictsky kick), Tulsa 48–42

Passing

- Tulsa – Justin Allgood: 26/42, 283 yards, 6 TD
- Philadelphia – Brandon Kirsch: 14/25, 180 yards, 2 TD, 3 INT

Rushing

- Tulsa – J.J. Payne: 2 att, 9 yards
- Philadelphia – Brandon Kirsch: 1 att, 0 yards

Receiving

- Tulsa – Troy McBroom: 10 rec, 152 yards, 3 TD
- Philadelphia – Syvelle Newton: 11 rec, 160 yards, 4 TD

=== Week 16: vs. Dallas Vigilantes ===
Week 16: Dallas Vigilantes at Tulsa Talons – Game summary

Quarter	1	2	3	4	Total
Vigilantes	21	14	6	14	55
Talons	7	7	20	14	48

at BOK Center, Tulsa, Oklahoma

- Date: June 25
- Game time: 7:00 p.m. CDT
- Referee: Shawn Hochuli
- Recap

Game information

1st quarter

- Dallas – (9:42) Anthony Jones 4-yard pass from Dan Raudabaugh (Remy Hamilton kick), Dallas 7–0
- Tulsa – (6:17) Brandon Copeland 15-yard pass from Justin Allgood (Juan Bongarra kick), Tied 7–7
- Dallas – (5:23) Chris LeFlore 55-yard kickoff return (Remy Hamilton kick), Dallas 14–7
- Dallas – (1:53) Matt Fields 10-yard pass from Dan Raudabaugh (Remy Hamilton kick), Dallas 21–7

2nd quarter

- Tulsa – (12:20) J.J. Payne 3-yard run (Juan Bongarra kick), Dallas 21–14
- Dallas – (7:38) Anthony Jones 6-yard pass from Dan Raudabaugh (Remy Hamilton kick), Dallas 28–14
- Dallas – (0:35) Matt Fields 1-yard pass from Dan Raudabaugh (Remy Hamilton kick), Dallas 35–14

3rd quarter

- Tulsa – (13:10) Matt Bassuener 1-yard run (Juan Bongarra kick), Dallas 35–21
- Dallas – (9:13) Anthony Jones 8-yard pass from Dan Raudabaugh (Remy Hamilton kick failed), Dallas 41–21
- Tulsa – (3:34) Troy McBroom 4-yard pass from Justin Allgood (Juan Bongarra kick failed), Dallas 41–27
- Tulsa – (0:12) Troy McBroom 9-yard pass from Justin Allgood (Juan Bongarra kick), Dallas 41–34

4th quarter

- Dallas – (13:57) Anthony Jones 41-yard pass from Dan Raudabaugh (Remy Hamilton kick), Dallas 48–34
- Dallas – (8:00) Anthony Jones 8-yard pass from Dan Raudabaugh (Remy Hamilton kick), Dallas 55–34
- Tulsa – (6:47) Trent Shelton 45-yard pass from Justin Allgood (Juan Bongarra kick), Dallas 55–41
- Tulsa – (0:55) Brandon Copeland 10-yard pass from Justin Allgood (Juan Bongarra kick), Dallas 55–48

Passing

- Dallas – Dan Raudabaugh: 24/37, 261 yards, 7 TD, 1 INT
- Tulsa – Justin Allgood: 25/52, 296 yards, 5 TD

Rushing

- Dallas – Derrick Ross: 8 att, 23 yards
- Tulsa – J.J. Payne: 2 att, 7 yards, 1 TD

Receiving

- Dallas – Anthony Jones: 14 rec, 162 yards, 5 TD
- Tulsa – Trent Shelton: 5 rec, 104 yards, 1 TD

=== Week 17: at Iowa Barnstormers ===
Week 17: Tulsa Talons at Iowa Barnstormers – Game summary

Quarter	1	2	3	4	Total
Talons	13	19	14	7	53
Barnstormers	14	16	14	11	55

at Wells Fargo Arena, Des Moines, Iowa

- Date: July 1
- Game time: 7:05 p.m. CDT
- Game attendance: 8,156
- Referee: Tony Canella

Game information

1st quarter

- Tulsa – (9:59) Bobby Reid 3-yard run (Juan Bongarra kick failed), Tulsa 6–0
- Iowa – (7:43) Jesse Schmidt 7-yard pass from Brad Banks (Nick Pertuit kick), Iowa 7–6
- Tulsa – (3:47) Troy McBroom 13-yard pass from Justin Allgood (Juan Bongarra kick), Tulsa 13–7
- Iowa – (1:06) Jesse Schmidt 8-yard pass from Brad Banks (Nick Pertuit kick), Iowa 14–13

2nd quarter

- Tulsa – (13:17) Al Hunt 3-yard run (Al Hunt rush failed), Tulsa 19–14
- Tulsa – (7:12) Brandon Copeland 10-yard pass from Justin Allgood (Juan Bongarra kick), Tulsa 26–14
- Iowa – (1:18) Jesse Schmidt 8-yard pass from Brad Banks (Nick Pertuit kick), Tulsa 26–21
- Iowa – (0:55) Team safety, Tulsa 26–23
- Iowa – (0:48) Marquis Hamilton 5-yard pass from Brad Banks (Nick Pertuit kick), Iowa 30–26
- Tulsa – (0:19) Troy McBroom 20-yard pass from Justin Allgood (Juan Bongarra kick failed), Tulsa 32–30

3rd quarter

- Tulsa – (11:48) Al Hunt 8-yard pass from Justin Allgood (Juan Bongarra kick), Tulsa 39–30
- Iowa – (10:41) Jesse Schmidt 35-yard pass from Brad Banks (Nick Pertuit kick), Tulsa 39–37
- Tulsa – (7:46) J.J. Payne 4-yard run (Juan Bongarra kick), Tulsa 46–37
- Iowa – (1:07) Brad Banks 1-yard run (Nick Pertuit kick), Tulsa 46–44

4th quarter

- Tulsa – (10:06) Al Hunt 14-yard pass from Justin Allgood (Juan Bongarra kick), Tulsa 53–44
- Iowa – (6:05) Marquis Hamilton 7-yard pass from Brad Banks (Brad Banks pass), Tulsa 53–52
- Iowa – (0:47) Nick Pertuit 20-yard field goal, Iowa 55–53

Passing

- Tulsa – Justin Allgood: 26/42, 241 yards, 5 TD
- Iowa – Brad Banks: 23/37, 264 yards, 6 TD

Rushing

- Tulsa – J.J. Payne: 5 att, 46 yards, 1 TD
- Iowa – Brad Banks: 5 att, 4 yards, 1 TD

Receiving

- Tulsa – Troy McBroom: 9 rec, 101 yards, 2 TD
- Iowa – Jesse Schmidt: 10 rec, 150 yards, 4 TD

=== Week 18: vs. Tampa Bay Storm ===
Week 18: Tampa Bay Storm at Tulsa Talons – Game summary

Quarter	1	2	3	4	Total
Storm	6	7	7	13	33
Talons	14	28	28	0	70

at BOK Center, Tulsa, Oklahoma

- Date: July 9
- Game time: 7:00 p.m. CDT
- Game attendance: 4,945
- Referee: Joe Pester
- Recap

Game information

1st quarter

- Tulsa – (14:16) Jamar Ransom 0-yard fumble recovery (Juan Bongarra kick), Tulsa 7–0
- Tampa Bay – (9:21) Hank Edwards 5-yard pass from Brian Zbydniewski (Kyle Chilton kick failed), Tulsa 7–6
- Tulsa – (7:22) Brandon Copeland 15-yard pass from Justin Allgood (Juan Bongarra kick), Tulsa 14–6

2nd quarter

- Tulsa – (12:34) Troy McBroom 14-yard pass from Justin Allgood (Juan Bongarra kick), Tulsa 21–6
- Tampa Bay – (10:44) Hank Edwards 25-yard pass from Brian Zbydniewski (Kyle Chilton kick), Tulsa 21–13
- Tulsa – (8:53) Brandon Copeland 45-yard pass from Justin Allgood (Juan Bongarra kick), Tulsa 28–13
- Tulsa – (2:08) Bobby Reid 1-yard run (Juan Bongarra kick), Tulsa 35–13
- Tulsa – (0:08) Troy McBroom 18-yard pass from Justin Allgood (Juan Bongarra kick), Tulsa 42–13

3rd quarter

- Tulsa – (12:15) Troy McBroom 5-yard pass from Justin Allgood (Juan Bongarra kick), Tulsa 49–13
- Tampa Bay – (10:00) Huey Whittaker 16-yard pass from Brian Zbydniewski (Kyle Chilton kick), Tulsa 49–20
- Tulsa – (8:35) Brandon Copeland 6-yard pass from Justin Allgood (Juan Bongarra kick), Tulsa 56–20
- Tulsa – (3:22) J.J. Payne 24-yard run (Juan Bongarra kick), Tulsa 63–20
- Tulsa – (0:08) Brandon Copeland 7-yard pass from Justin Allgood (Juan Bongarra kick), Tulsa 70–20

4th quarter

- Tampa Bay – (13:46) Huey Whittaker 6-yard pass from Danny Southwick (Kyle Chilton kick), Tulsa 70–27
- Tampa Bay – (7:05) Markihe Anderson 20-yard interception return (Kyle Chilton kick failed), Tulsa 70–33

Passing

- Tampa Bay – Brian Zbydniewski: 15/29, 197 yards, 3 TD, 1 INT
- Tulsa – Justin Allgood: 21/34, 220 yards, 7 TD

Rushing

- Tampa Bay – Terrance Royal: 1 att, 2 yards
- Tulsa – Bobby Reid: 5 att, 54 yards, 1 TD

Receiving

- Tampa Bay – Hank Edwards: 6 rec, 107 yards, 2 TD
- Tulsa – Brandon Copeland: 9 rec, 107 yards, 4 TD

=== Week 19: vs. Orlando Predators ===
Week 19: Orlando Predators at Tulsa Talons – Game summary

Quarter	1	2	3	4	Total
Predators	14	28	21	22	85
Talons	14	7	14	14	49

at BOK Center, Tulsa, Oklahoma

- Date: July 9
- Game time: 7:00 p.m. CDT
- Game attendance: 6,166
- Referee: Chris Snead
- Recap

Game information

1st quarter

- Tulsa – (11:30) Al Hunt 4-yard pass from Justin Allgood (Juan Bongarra kick), Tulsa 7–0
- Orlando – (9:28) Bobby Sippio 2-yard run (Mark Lewis kick), Tied 7–7
- Orlando – (5:35) Bobby Sippio 6-yard run (Mark Lewis kick), Orlando 14–7
- Tulsa – (3:06) Troy McBroom 29-yard pass from Justin Allgood (Juan Bongarra kick), Tied 14–14

2nd quarter

- Orlando – (13:10) Robert Quiroga 10-yard pass from Nick Hill (Mark Lewis kick), Orlando 21–14
- Tulsa – (9:33) Al Hunt 7-yard pass from Justin Allgood (Juan Bongarra kick), Tied 21–21
- Orlando – (3:53) Robert Quiroga 9-yard pass from Nick Hill (Mark Lewis kick), Orlando 28–21
- Orlando – (0:30) Robert Quiroga 7-yard pass from Nick Hill (Mark Lewis kick), Orlando 35–21
- Orlando – (0:19) Rayshaun Kizer 17-yard interception return (Mark Lewis kick), Orlando 42–21

3rd quarter

- Orlando – (10:22) Robert Quiroga 5-yard pass from Nick Hill (Mark Lewis kick), Orlando 49–21
- Tulsa – (7:27) Craig Fulton 4-yard run (Juan Bongarra kick), Orlando 49–28
- Orlando – (5:45) T.T. Toliver 7-yard pass from Nick Hill (Mark Lewis kick), Orlando 56–28
- Tulsa – (3:02) Bobby Reid 36-yard run (Juan Bongarra kick), Orlando 56–35
- Orlando – (1:05) Bobby Sippio 35-yard pass from Nick Hill (Mark Lewis kick), Orlando 63–35

4th quarter

- Orlando – (14:51) Team safety, Orlando 65–35
- Tulsa – (13:38) Team safety, Orlando 65–37
- Orlando – (8:10) Bobby Sippio 31-yard pass from Nick Hill (Mark Lewis kick), Orlando 72–37
- Orlando – (6:30) Josh Bush 0-yard fumble recovery (Mark Lewis kick), Orlando 79–37
- Tulsa – (5:40) Bobby Reid 3-yard run (Juan Bongarra kick failed), Orlando 79–43
- Orlando – (5:02) Josh Bush 57-yard kickoff return (Mark Lewis kick failed), Orlando 85–43
- Tulsa – (2:28) J.J. Payne 10-yard run (Juan Bongarra kick failed), Orlando 85–49

Passing

- Orlando – Nick Hill: 33/42, 345 yards, 8 TD
- Tulsa – Justin Allgood: 18/24, 233 yards, 3 TD, 2 INT

Rushing

- Orlando – Bobby Sippio: 1 att, 2 yards, 1 TD
- Tulsa – Bobby Reid: 3 att, 43 yards, 2 TD

Receiving

- Orlando – Bobby Sippio: 12 rec, 167 yards, 3 TD
- Tulsa – Al Hunt: 8 rec, 114 yards, 2 TD

=== Week 20: at Kansas City Command ===
Week 20: Tulsa Talons at Kansas City Command – Game summary

Quarter	1	2	3	4	Total
Talons	14	20	10	27	71
Command	7	7	14	27	55

at Sprint Center, Kansas City, Missouri

- Date: July 23
- Game time: 7:00 p.m. CDT
- Game attendance: 5,575
- Referee: Reggie Smith

Game information

1st quarter

- Tulsa – (12:53) Troy McBroom 18-yard pass from Justin Allgood (Juan Bongarra kick), Tulsa 7–0
- Kansas City – (8:15) Steven Savoy 4-yard pass from Steve Wasil (Brian Umstead kick), Tied 7–7
- Tulsa – (2:52) J.J. Payne 1-yard fumble recovery (Juan Bongarra kick), Tulsa 14–7

2nd quarter

- Tulsa – (10:06) Jamar Ransom 1-yard run (Juan Bongarra kick), Tulsa 21–7
- Kansas City – (8:49) Brent Holmes 35-yard pass from Steve Wasil (Brian Umstead kick), Tulsa 21–14
- Tulsa – (0:55) Jamar Ransom 1-yard run (Juan Bongarra kick), Tulsa 28–14
- Tulsa – (0:13) Brandon Copeland 37-yard pass from Justin Allgood (Juan Bongarra kick failed), Tulsa 34–14

3rd quarter

- Kansas City – (11:45) Robert Gill 28-yard pass from Steve Wasil (Brian Umstead kick), Tulsa 34–21
- Tulsa – (6:22) Juan Bongarra 21-yard field goal, Tulsa 37–21
- Kansas City – (4:00) Lee Bryant 2-yard run (Brian Umstead kick), Tulsa 37–28
- Tulsa – (2:31) J.J. Payne 7-yard pass from Justin Allgood (Juan Bongarra kick), Tulsa 44–28

4th quarter

- Tulsa – (10:45) J.J. Payne 8-yard run (Juan Bongarra kick), Tulsa 51–28
- Kansas City – (9:41) Brent Holmes 33-yard pass from Steve Wasil (Brian Umstead kick), Tulsa 51–35
- Tulsa – (8:43) Craig Fulton 12-yard pass from Justin Allgood (Juan Bongarra kick), Tulsa 58–35
- Kansas City – (6:24) Brent Holmes 19-yard pass from Steve Wasil (Brian Umstead kick), Tulsa 58–42
- Tulsa – (5:48) Brandon Copeland 4-yard kickoff return (Juan Bongarra kick blocked), Tulsa 64–42
- Kansas City – (4:04) Robert Gill 45-yard pass from Steve Wasil (Steve Wasil pass failed), Tulsa 64–48
- Tulsa – (1:18) Jamar Ransom 5-yard run (Juan Bongarra kick), Tulsa 71–48
- Kansas City – (0:17) Steve Gachette 11-yard run (Brian Umstead kick), Tulsa 71–55

Passing

- Tulsa – Justin Allgood: 31/42, 310 yards, 4 TD
- Kansas City – Steve Wasil: 14/26, 259 yards, 6 TD, 3 INT

Rushing

- Tulsa – Jamar Ransom: 3 att, 7 yards, 3 TD
- Kansas City – Steve Gachette: 1 att, 11 yards, 1 TD

Receiving

- Tulsa – Troy McBroom: 12 rec, 142 yards, 1 TD
- Kansas City – Brent Holmes: 6 rec, 109 yards, 3 TD
